

33001–33100 

|-bgcolor=#C2E0FF
| 33001 ||  || — || February 6, 1997 || Mauna Kea || D. C. Jewitt, J. X. Luu, C. Trujillo, J. Chen || cubewano (cold) || align=right | 280 km || 
|-id=002 bgcolor=#d6d6d6
| 33002 Everest || 1997 DM ||  || February 17, 1997 || Colleverde || V. S. Casulli || — || align=right | 6.7 km || 
|-id=003 bgcolor=#d6d6d6
| 33003 || 1997 EJ || — || March 1, 1997 || Oizumi || T. Kobayashi || EOS || align=right | 9.3 km || 
|-id=004 bgcolor=#d6d6d6
| 33004 Dianesipiera || 1997 EP ||  || March 2, 1997 || Prescott || P. G. Comba || — || align=right | 5.8 km || 
|-id=005 bgcolor=#d6d6d6
| 33005 ||  || — || March 2, 1997 || Kitt Peak || Spacewatch || HYG || align=right | 7.8 km || 
|-id=006 bgcolor=#d6d6d6
| 33006 ||  || — || March 6, 1997 || Kleť || Kleť Obs. || — || align=right | 13 km || 
|-id=007 bgcolor=#d6d6d6
| 33007 ||  || — || March 7, 1997 || Kitt Peak || Spacewatch || — || align=right | 8.0 km || 
|-id=008 bgcolor=#d6d6d6
| 33008 ||  || — || March 3, 1997 || Kitami || K. Endate, K. Watanabe || — || align=right | 16 km || 
|-id=009 bgcolor=#d6d6d6
| 33009 ||  || — || March 7, 1997 || Kitt Peak || Spacewatch || THM || align=right | 3.6 km || 
|-id=010 bgcolor=#fefefe
| 33010 Enricoprosperi ||  ||  || March 11, 1997 || San Marcello || L. Tesi, G. Cattani || V || align=right | 3.0 km || 
|-id=011 bgcolor=#E9E9E9
| 33011 Kurtiscarsch ||  ||  || March 4, 1997 || Socorro || LINEAR || EUN || align=right | 3.9 km || 
|-id=012 bgcolor=#d6d6d6
| 33012 Eddieirizarry ||  ||  || March 9, 1997 || La Silla || E. W. Elst || — || align=right | 7.9 km || 
|-id=013 bgcolor=#d6d6d6
| 33013 || 1997 FZ || — || March 28, 1997 || Xinglong || SCAP || THM || align=right | 7.3 km || 
|-id=014 bgcolor=#d6d6d6
| 33014 Kalinich ||  ||  || March 31, 1997 || Socorro || LINEAR || THM || align=right | 8.5 km || 
|-id=015 bgcolor=#fefefe
| 33015 ||  || — || April 2, 1997 || Socorro || LINEAR || — || align=right | 1.8 km || 
|-id=016 bgcolor=#d6d6d6
| 33016 ||  || — || April 13, 1997 || Xinglong || SCAP || — || align=right | 8.2 km || 
|-id=017 bgcolor=#d6d6d6
| 33017 Wronski ||  ||  || April 9, 1997 || La Silla || E. W. Elst || — || align=right | 17 km || 
|-id=018 bgcolor=#d6d6d6
| 33018 ||  || — || April 28, 1997 || Socorro || LINEAR || — || align=right | 9.2 km || 
|-id=019 bgcolor=#fefefe
| 33019 ||  || — || June 28, 1997 || Socorro || LINEAR || — || align=right | 2.8 km || 
|-id=020 bgcolor=#fefefe
| 33020 ||  || — || June 30, 1997 || Kitt Peak || Spacewatch || — || align=right | 1.6 km || 
|-id=021 bgcolor=#fefefe
| 33021 ||  || — || June 28, 1997 || Socorro || LINEAR || NYS || align=right | 3.5 km || 
|-id=022 bgcolor=#fefefe
| 33022 || 1997 NN || — || July 1, 1997 || Kitt Peak || Spacewatch || — || align=right | 2.7 km || 
|-id=023 bgcolor=#E9E9E9
| 33023 ||  || — || August 3, 1997 || Xinglong || SCAP || — || align=right | 3.9 km || 
|-id=024 bgcolor=#fefefe
| 33024 ||  || — || August 11, 1997 || Xinglong || SCAP || — || align=right | 2.1 km || 
|-id=025 bgcolor=#fefefe
| 33025 ||  || — || August 3, 1997 || Xinglong || SCAP || — || align=right | 1.9 km || 
|-id=026 bgcolor=#fefefe
| 33026 ||  || — || August 5, 1997 || Reedy Creek || J. Broughton || FLO || align=right | 2.2 km || 
|-id=027 bgcolor=#fefefe
| 33027 Brouillac || 1997 QE ||  || August 23, 1997 || Castres || A. Klotz || — || align=right | 1.7 km || 
|-id=028 bgcolor=#fefefe
| 33028 || 1997 QN || — || August 24, 1997 || Dynic || A. Sugie || — || align=right | 2.9 km || 
|-id=029 bgcolor=#fefefe
| 33029 || 1997 QV || — || August 25, 1997 || Lake Clear || K. A. Williams || — || align=right | 2.0 km || 
|-id=030 bgcolor=#fefefe
| 33030 ||  || — || August 27, 1997 || Nachi-Katsuura || Y. Shimizu, T. Urata || — || align=right | 2.7 km || 
|-id=031 bgcolor=#fefefe
| 33031 Paolofini || 1997 RX ||  || September 1, 1997 || San Marcello || A. Boattini, M. Tombelli || NYS || align=right | 1.8 km || 
|-id=032 bgcolor=#E9E9E9
| 33032 ||  || — || September 12, 1997 || Xinglong || SCAP || — || align=right | 2.2 km || 
|-id=033 bgcolor=#fefefe
| 33033 ||  || — || September 12, 1997 || Xinglong || SCAP || NYS || align=right | 5.6 km || 
|-id=034 bgcolor=#fefefe
| 33034 Dianadamrau ||  ||  || September 3, 1997 || Caussols || ODAS || FLO || align=right | 1.9 km || 
|-id=035 bgcolor=#fefefe
| 33035 Pareschi ||  ||  || September 27, 1997 || Sormano || M. Cavagna, A. Testa || V || align=right | 2.0 km || 
|-id=036 bgcolor=#fefefe
| 33036 ||  || — || September 26, 1997 || Xinglong || SCAP || — || align=right | 3.6 km || 
|-id=037 bgcolor=#fefefe
| 33037 ||  || — || September 28, 1997 || Kitt Peak || Spacewatch || FLO || align=right | 1.9 km || 
|-id=038 bgcolor=#fefefe
| 33038 ||  || — || September 30, 1997 || Kitt Peak || Spacewatch || — || align=right | 4.1 km || 
|-id=039 bgcolor=#E9E9E9
| 33039 ||  || — || September 30, 1997 || Kitt Peak || Spacewatch || — || align=right | 3.3 km || 
|-id=040 bgcolor=#fefefe
| 33040 Pavelmayer ||  ||  || September 28, 1997 || Ondřejov || M. Wolf || — || align=right | 4.0 km || 
|-id=041 bgcolor=#E9E9E9
| 33041 ||  || — || October 6, 1997 || Nachi-Katsuura || Y. Shimizu, T. Urata || — || align=right | 3.3 km || 
|-id=042 bgcolor=#fefefe
| 33042 ||  || — || October 6, 1997 || Xinglong || SCAP || — || align=right | 2.3 km || 
|-id=043 bgcolor=#fefefe
| 33043 ||  || — || October 6, 1997 || Kitt Peak || Spacewatch || NYS || align=right | 1.7 km || 
|-id=044 bgcolor=#fefefe
| 33044 Erikdavy || 1997 UE ||  || October 20, 1997 || Prescott || P. G. Comba || — || align=right | 2.1 km || 
|-id=045 bgcolor=#fefefe
| 33045 ||  || — || October 21, 1997 || Nachi-Katsuura || Y. Shimizu, T. Urata || FLO || align=right | 2.2 km || 
|-id=046 bgcolor=#fefefe
| 33046 ||  || — || October 21, 1997 || Nachi-Katsuura || Y. Shimizu, T. Urata || — || align=right | 2.4 km || 
|-id=047 bgcolor=#fefefe
| 33047 ||  || — || October 26, 1997 || Oizumi || T. Kobayashi || — || align=right | 2.8 km || 
|-id=048 bgcolor=#fefefe
| 33048 ||  || — || October 20, 1997 || Xinglong || SCAP || — || align=right | 2.8 km || 
|-id=049 bgcolor=#fefefe
| 33049 ||  || — || October 25, 1997 || Sormano || P. Sicoli, A. Testa || V || align=right | 2.0 km || 
|-id=050 bgcolor=#fefefe
| 33050 ||  || — || October 23, 1997 || Kitt Peak || Spacewatch || MAS || align=right | 1.5 km || 
|-id=051 bgcolor=#fefefe
| 33051 ||  || — || October 27, 1997 || Lime Creek || R. Linderholm || V || align=right | 2.1 km || 
|-id=052 bgcolor=#fefefe
| 33052 ||  || — || October 29, 1997 || Kleť || Kleť Obs. || NYS || align=right | 2.3 km || 
|-id=053 bgcolor=#fefefe
| 33053 ||  || — || October 23, 1997 || Kitt Peak || Spacewatch || — || align=right | 1.4 km || 
|-id=054 bgcolor=#fefefe
| 33054 Eduardorossi ||  ||  || October 26, 1997 || San Marcello || M. Tombelli, A. Boattini || — || align=right | 2.4 km || 
|-id=055 bgcolor=#fefefe
| 33055 ||  || — || October 26, 1997 || Nachi-Katsuura || Y. Shimizu, T. Urata || — || align=right | 2.7 km || 
|-id=056 bgcolor=#fefefe
| 33056 Ogunimachi ||  ||  || October 29, 1997 || Nanyo || T. Okuni || NYS || align=right | 6.3 km || 
|-id=057 bgcolor=#fefefe
| 33057 ||  || — || October 25, 1997 || Kitt Peak || Spacewatch || — || align=right | 3.6 km || 
|-id=058 bgcolor=#fefefe
| 33058 Kovařík ||  ||  || October 22, 1997 || Ondřejov || P. Pravec, L. Kotková || FLO || align=right | 2.8 km || 
|-id=059 bgcolor=#fefefe
| 33059 || 1997 VS || — || November 1, 1997 || Kitami || K. Endate, K. Watanabe || NYS || align=right | 2.5 km || 
|-id=060 bgcolor=#FA8072
| 33060 || 1997 VY || — || November 1, 1997 || Oizumi || T. Kobayashi || — || align=right | 2.5 km || 
|-id=061 bgcolor=#fefefe
| 33061 Václavmorava ||  ||  || November 2, 1997 || Kleť || J. Tichá, M. Tichý || NYS || align=right | 1.7 km || 
|-id=062 bgcolor=#fefefe
| 33062 ||  || — || November 1, 1997 || Xinglong || SCAP || — || align=right | 2.4 km || 
|-id=063 bgcolor=#fefefe
| 33063 ||  || — || November 6, 1997 || Oizumi || T. Kobayashi || — || align=right | 2.9 km || 
|-id=064 bgcolor=#fefefe
| 33064 ||  || — || November 6, 1997 || Oizumi || T. Kobayashi || NYS || align=right | 2.9 km || 
|-id=065 bgcolor=#fefefe
| 33065 ||  || — || November 8, 1997 || Oizumi || T. Kobayashi || NYS || align=right | 4.4 km || 
|-id=066 bgcolor=#fefefe
| 33066 ||  || — || November 3, 1997 || Stroncone || Santa Lucia Obs. || — || align=right | 2.4 km || 
|-id=067 bgcolor=#fefefe
| 33067 || 1997 WJ || — || November 18, 1997 || Oizumi || T. Kobayashi || — || align=right | 3.4 km || 
|-id=068 bgcolor=#fefefe
| 33068 ||  || — || November 21, 1997 || Xinglong || SCAP || — || align=right | 2.0 km || 
|-id=069 bgcolor=#fefefe
| 33069 ||  || — || November 23, 1997 || Oizumi || T. Kobayashi || — || align=right | 3.1 km || 
|-id=070 bgcolor=#E9E9E9
| 33070 ||  || — || November 23, 1997 || Chichibu || N. Satō || — || align=right | 6.0 km || 
|-id=071 bgcolor=#E9E9E9
| 33071 ||  || — || November 22, 1997 || Kitt Peak || Spacewatch || — || align=right | 5.4 km || 
|-id=072 bgcolor=#fefefe
| 33072 ||  || — || November 23, 1997 || Kitt Peak || Spacewatch || — || align=right | 2.7 km || 
|-id=073 bgcolor=#FA8072
| 33073 ||  || — || November 28, 1997 || Haleakala || NEAT || — || align=right | 2.5 km || 
|-id=074 bgcolor=#d6d6d6
| 33074 ||  || — || November 30, 1997 || Oizumi || T. Kobayashi || URS || align=right | 18 km || 
|-id=075 bgcolor=#E9E9E9
| 33075 ||  || — || November 22, 1997 || Kitt Peak || Spacewatch || — || align=right | 4.5 km || 
|-id=076 bgcolor=#fefefe
| 33076 ||  || — || November 28, 1997 || Kitt Peak || Spacewatch || FLO || align=right | 2.8 km || 
|-id=077 bgcolor=#fefefe
| 33077 ||  || — || November 28, 1997 || Kitt Peak || Spacewatch || — || align=right | 3.8 km || 
|-id=078 bgcolor=#fefefe
| 33078 ||  || — || November 29, 1997 || Socorro || LINEAR || — || align=right | 4.0 km || 
|-id=079 bgcolor=#fefefe
| 33079 ||  || — || November 29, 1997 || Socorro || LINEAR || FLO || align=right | 2.3 km || 
|-id=080 bgcolor=#fefefe
| 33080 ||  || — || November 29, 1997 || Socorro || LINEAR || — || align=right | 3.3 km || 
|-id=081 bgcolor=#fefefe
| 33081 ||  || — || November 29, 1997 || Socorro || LINEAR || NYS || align=right | 2.3 km || 
|-id=082 bgcolor=#fefefe
| 33082 ||  || — || November 29, 1997 || Socorro || LINEAR || — || align=right | 3.0 km || 
|-id=083 bgcolor=#fefefe
| 33083 ||  || — || November 26, 1997 || Socorro || LINEAR || NYS || align=right | 1.8 km || 
|-id=084 bgcolor=#fefefe
| 33084 ||  || — || November 26, 1997 || Socorro || LINEAR || FLO || align=right | 3.3 km || 
|-id=085 bgcolor=#fefefe
| 33085 ||  || — || November 21, 1997 || Kitt Peak || Spacewatch || NYS || align=right | 1.6 km || 
|-id=086 bgcolor=#E9E9E9
| 33086 || 1997 XS || — || December 3, 1997 || Oizumi || T. Kobayashi || — || align=right | 2.4 km || 
|-id=087 bgcolor=#fefefe
| 33087 || 1997 XX || — || December 3, 1997 || Oizumi || T. Kobayashi || — || align=right | 8.6 km || 
|-id=088 bgcolor=#fefefe
| 33088 ||  || — || December 3, 1997 || Chichibu || N. Satō || V || align=right | 1.6 km || 
|-id=089 bgcolor=#fefefe
| 33089 ||  || — || December 15, 1997 || Xinglong || SCAP || V || align=right | 2.8 km || 
|-id=090 bgcolor=#E9E9E9
| 33090 ||  || — || December 13, 1997 || Xinglong || SCAP || — || align=right | 4.1 km || 
|-id=091 bgcolor=#fefefe
| 33091 ||  || — || December 4, 1997 || Socorro || LINEAR || — || align=right | 2.5 km || 
|-id=092 bgcolor=#E9E9E9
| 33092 ||  || — || December 20, 1997 || Xinglong || SCAP || MIT || align=right | 7.7 km || 
|-id=093 bgcolor=#fefefe
| 33093 ||  || — || December 24, 1997 || Oizumi || T. Kobayashi || NYS || align=right | 3.1 km || 
|-id=094 bgcolor=#fefefe
| 33094 ||  || — || December 23, 1997 || Bédoin || P. Antonini || — || align=right | 2.5 km || 
|-id=095 bgcolor=#E9E9E9
| 33095 ||  || — || December 25, 1997 || Oizumi || T. Kobayashi || HEN || align=right | 3.0 km || 
|-id=096 bgcolor=#fefefe
| 33096 ||  || — || December 25, 1997 || Chichibu || N. Satō || — || align=right | 2.5 km || 
|-id=097 bgcolor=#fefefe
| 33097 ||  || — || December 25, 1997 || Haleakala || NEAT || — || align=right | 3.2 km || 
|-id=098 bgcolor=#E9E9E9
| 33098 ||  || — || December 25, 1997 || Oizumi || T. Kobayashi || EUN || align=right | 4.0 km || 
|-id=099 bgcolor=#fefefe
| 33099 ||  || — || December 27, 1997 || Woomera || F. B. Zoltowski || NYS || align=right | 4.1 km || 
|-id=100 bgcolor=#fefefe
| 33100 Udine ||  ||  || December 28, 1997 || Farra d'Isonzo || Farra d'Isonzo || V || align=right | 2.1 km || 
|}

33101–33200 

|-bgcolor=#E9E9E9
| 33101 ||  || — || December 28, 1997 || Oizumi || T. Kobayashi || RAF || align=right | 3.9 km || 
|-id=102 bgcolor=#E9E9E9
| 33102 ||  || — || December 22, 1997 || Xinglong || SCAP || — || align=right | 3.4 km || 
|-id=103 bgcolor=#fefefe
| 33103 Pintar ||  ||  || December 27, 1997 || Goodricke-Pigott || R. A. Tucker || — || align=right | 3.2 km || 
|-id=104 bgcolor=#E9E9E9
| 33104 ||  || — || December 29, 1997 || Kitt Peak || Spacewatch || — || align=right | 3.1 km || 
|-id=105 bgcolor=#E9E9E9
| 33105 ||  || — || December 31, 1997 || Oizumi || T. Kobayashi || — || align=right | 6.3 km || 
|-id=106 bgcolor=#fefefe
| 33106 ||  || — || December 31, 1997 || Oohira || T. Urata || — || align=right | 5.1 km || 
|-id=107 bgcolor=#fefefe
| 33107 ||  || — || December 31, 1997 || Nachi-Katsuura || Y. Shimizu, T. Urata || — || align=right | 5.8 km || 
|-id=108 bgcolor=#d6d6d6
| 33108 ||  || — || December 21, 1997 || Xinglong || SCAP || slow? || align=right | 4.9 km || 
|-id=109 bgcolor=#E9E9E9
| 33109 ||  || — || January 1, 1998 || Kitt Peak || Spacewatch || — || align=right | 2.7 km || 
|-id=110 bgcolor=#fefefe
| 33110 ||  || — || January 2, 1998 || Reedy Creek || J. Broughton || — || align=right | 5.1 km || 
|-id=111 bgcolor=#E9E9E9
| 33111 || 1998 BL || — || January 18, 1998 || Oizumi || T. Kobayashi || MRX || align=right | 3.6 km || 
|-id=112 bgcolor=#E9E9E9
| 33112 ||  || — || January 19, 1998 || Oizumi || T. Kobayashi || — || align=right | 8.9 km || 
|-id=113 bgcolor=#E9E9E9
| 33113 Julabeth ||  ||  || January 22, 1998 || Prescott || P. G. Comba || — || align=right | 3.0 km || 
|-id=114 bgcolor=#E9E9E9
| 33114 ||  || — || January 18, 1998 || Kitt Peak || Spacewatch || — || align=right | 2.6 km || 
|-id=115 bgcolor=#E9E9E9
| 33115 ||  || — || January 25, 1998 || Oizumi || T. Kobayashi || MAR || align=right | 3.1 km || 
|-id=116 bgcolor=#fefefe
| 33116 ||  || — || January 23, 1998 || Socorro || LINEAR || — || align=right | 4.4 km || 
|-id=117 bgcolor=#fefefe
| 33117 Ashinimodi ||  ||  || January 23, 1998 || Socorro || LINEAR || — || align=right | 2.5 km || 
|-id=118 bgcolor=#E9E9E9
| 33118 Naiknaware ||  ||  || January 23, 1998 || Socorro || LINEAR || — || align=right | 2.7 km || 
|-id=119 bgcolor=#E9E9E9
| 33119 ||  || — || January 24, 1998 || Haleakala || NEAT || — || align=right | 6.2 km || 
|-id=120 bgcolor=#E9E9E9
| 33120 ||  || — || January 24, 1998 || Haleakala || NEAT || — || align=right | 7.5 km || 
|-id=121 bgcolor=#E9E9E9
| 33121 ||  || — || January 24, 1998 || Haleakala || NEAT || — || align=right | 4.3 km || 
|-id=122 bgcolor=#E9E9E9
| 33122 ||  || — || January 22, 1998 || Kitt Peak || Spacewatch || — || align=right | 4.7 km || 
|-id=123 bgcolor=#E9E9E9
| 33123 ||  || — || January 26, 1998 || Kitt Peak || Spacewatch || — || align=right | 5.5 km || 
|-id=124 bgcolor=#E9E9E9
| 33124 ||  || — || January 31, 1998 || Oizumi || T. Kobayashi || — || align=right | 6.4 km || 
|-id=125 bgcolor=#E9E9E9
| 33125 ||  || — || January 31, 1998 || Oizumi || T. Kobayashi || — || align=right | 3.2 km || 
|-id=126 bgcolor=#E9E9E9
| 33126 ||  || — || January 31, 1998 || Oizumi || T. Kobayashi || — || align=right | 8.1 km || 
|-id=127 bgcolor=#E9E9E9
| 33127 ||  || — || January 26, 1998 || Haleakala || NEAT || — || align=right | 7.8 km || 
|-id=128 bgcolor=#C2E0FF
| 33128 ||  || — || January 22, 1998 || Steward Observatory || N. Danzl || centaur || align=right | 179 km || 
|-id=129 bgcolor=#d6d6d6
| 33129 Ivankrasko || 1998 CB ||  || February 1, 1998 || Modra || P. Kolény, L. Kornoš || — || align=right | 7.5 km || 
|-id=130 bgcolor=#E9E9E9
| 33130 ||  || — || February 1, 1998 || Bergisch Gladbach || W. Bickel || — || align=right | 3.3 km || 
|-id=131 bgcolor=#E9E9E9
| 33131 ||  || — || February 6, 1998 || La Silla || E. W. Elst || — || align=right | 3.9 km || 
|-id=132 bgcolor=#E9E9E9
| 33132 ||  || — || February 13, 1998 || Xinglong || SCAP || MAR || align=right | 5.9 km || 
|-id=133 bgcolor=#E9E9E9
| 33133 ||  || — || February 6, 1998 || La Silla || E. W. Elst || VIB || align=right | 6.8 km || 
|-id=134 bgcolor=#E9E9E9
| 33134 ||  || — || February 6, 1998 || La Silla || E. W. Elst || — || align=right | 5.3 km || 
|-id=135 bgcolor=#fefefe
| 33135 Davidrisoldi || 1998 DX ||  || February 19, 1998 || Stroncone || Santa Lucia Obs. || V || align=right | 3.2 km || 
|-id=136 bgcolor=#E9E9E9
| 33136 || 1998 DZ || — || February 18, 1998 || Kleť || Kleť Obs. || — || align=right | 2.7 km || 
|-id=137 bgcolor=#E9E9E9
| 33137 Strejček ||  ||  || February 20, 1998 || Modra || A. Galád, A. Pravda || — || align=right | 2.7 km || 
|-id=138 bgcolor=#E9E9E9
| 33138 ||  || — || February 20, 1998 || Caussols || ODAS || — || align=right | 4.1 km || 
|-id=139 bgcolor=#E9E9E9
| 33139 ||  || — || February 16, 1998 || Xinglong || SCAP || — || align=right | 3.1 km || 
|-id=140 bgcolor=#E9E9E9
| 33140 ||  || — || February 22, 1998 || Haleakala || NEAT || MAR || align=right | 6.1 km || 
|-id=141 bgcolor=#E9E9E9
| 33141 ||  || — || February 22, 1998 || Haleakala || NEAT || — || align=right | 2.1 km || 
|-id=142 bgcolor=#E9E9E9
| 33142 ||  || — || February 22, 1998 || Haleakala || NEAT || — || align=right | 6.6 km || 
|-id=143 bgcolor=#d6d6d6
| 33143 ||  || — || February 21, 1998 || Kitt Peak || Spacewatch || K-2 || align=right | 3.6 km || 
|-id=144 bgcolor=#E9E9E9
| 33144 ||  || — || February 22, 1998 || Kitt Peak || Spacewatch || MRX || align=right | 3.6 km || 
|-id=145 bgcolor=#E9E9E9
| 33145 ||  || — || February 21, 1998 || Xinglong || SCAP || — || align=right | 4.1 km || 
|-id=146 bgcolor=#E9E9E9
| 33146 ||  || — || February 21, 1998 || Xinglong || SCAP || — || align=right | 5.4 km || 
|-id=147 bgcolor=#E9E9E9
| 33147 ||  || — || February 22, 1998 || Haleakala || NEAT || — || align=right | 5.0 km || 
|-id=148 bgcolor=#E9E9E9
| 33148 ||  || — || February 22, 1998 || Haleakala || NEAT || — || align=right | 4.8 km || 
|-id=149 bgcolor=#E9E9E9
| 33149 ||  || — || February 22, 1998 || Haleakala || NEAT || AGN || align=right | 12 km || 
|-id=150 bgcolor=#E9E9E9
| 33150 ||  || — || February 23, 1998 || Haleakala || NEAT || EUN || align=right | 6.0 km || 
|-id=151 bgcolor=#E9E9E9
| 33151 ||  || — || February 25, 1998 || Sormano || M. Cavagna, P. Ghezzi || — || align=right | 4.8 km || 
|-id=152 bgcolor=#E9E9E9
| 33152 ||  || — || February 26, 1998 || Prescott || P. G. Comba || — || align=right | 4.3 km || 
|-id=153 bgcolor=#d6d6d6
| 33153 ||  || — || February 22, 1998 || Haleakala || NEAT || KOR || align=right | 5.3 km || 
|-id=154 bgcolor=#E9E9E9
| 33154 Talent ||  ||  || February 22, 1998 || Haleakala || NEAT || MAR || align=right | 4.7 km || 
|-id=155 bgcolor=#E9E9E9
| 33155 ||  || — || February 23, 1998 || Kitt Peak || Spacewatch || — || align=right | 5.0 km || 
|-id=156 bgcolor=#E9E9E9
| 33156 ||  || — || February 23, 1998 || Kitt Peak || Spacewatch || — || align=right | 3.1 km || 
|-id=157 bgcolor=#E9E9E9
| 33157 Pertile ||  ||  || February 24, 1998 || Ondřejov || P. Pravec || EUN || align=right | 4.5 km || 
|-id=158 bgcolor=#E9E9E9
| 33158 Rúfus ||  ||  || February 26, 1998 || Modra || P. Kolény, L. Kornoš || — || align=right | 3.1 km || 
|-id=159 bgcolor=#E9E9E9
| 33159 ||  || — || February 27, 1998 || La Silla || E. W. Elst || HEN || align=right | 3.9 km || 
|-id=160 bgcolor=#E9E9E9
| 33160 Denismukwege ||  ||  || February 27, 1998 || La Silla || E. W. Elst || WAT || align=right | 8.2 km || 
|-id=161 bgcolor=#E9E9E9
| 33161 ||  || — || February 27, 1998 || La Silla || E. W. Elst || — || align=right | 3.6 km || 
|-id=162 bgcolor=#E9E9E9
| 33162 Sofiarandich ||  ||  || February 27, 1998 || Cima Ekar || G. Forti, M. Tombelli || — || align=right | 2.6 km || 
|-id=163 bgcolor=#E9E9E9
| 33163 Alainaspect || 1998 EH ||  || March 2, 1998 || Caussols || CERGA || — || align=right | 2.9 km || 
|-id=164 bgcolor=#d6d6d6
| 33164 ||  || — || March 2, 1998 || Caussols || ODAS || KOR || align=right | 5.5 km || 
|-id=165 bgcolor=#d6d6d6
| 33165 Joschhambsch ||  ||  || March 2, 1998 || Caussols || CERGA || — || align=right | 11 km || 
|-id=166 bgcolor=#E9E9E9
| 33166 ||  || — || March 5, 1998 || Xinglong || SCAP || PAL || align=right | 8.1 km || 
|-id=167 bgcolor=#E9E9E9
| 33167 ||  || — || March 11, 1998 || Xinglong || SCAP || HNS || align=right | 4.4 km || 
|-id=168 bgcolor=#d6d6d6
| 33168 ||  || — || March 2, 1998 || Xinglong || SCAP || — || align=right | 8.6 km || 
|-id=169 bgcolor=#E9E9E9
| 33169 ||  || — || March 1, 1998 || La Silla || E. W. Elst || — || align=right | 4.2 km || 
|-id=170 bgcolor=#E9E9E9
| 33170 ||  || — || March 1, 1998 || La Silla || E. W. Elst || — || align=right | 7.2 km || 
|-id=171 bgcolor=#d6d6d6
| 33171 ||  || — || March 1, 1998 || La Silla || E. W. Elst || KOR || align=right | 4.9 km || 
|-id=172 bgcolor=#d6d6d6
| 33172 ||  || — || March 1, 1998 || La Silla || E. W. Elst || — || align=right | 6.7 km || 
|-id=173 bgcolor=#E9E9E9
| 33173 || 1998 FC || — || March 16, 1998 || Oizumi || T. Kobayashi || GEF || align=right | 3.8 km || 
|-id=174 bgcolor=#E9E9E9
| 33174 ||  || — || March 22, 1998 || Oizumi || T. Kobayashi || — || align=right | 3.9 km || 
|-id=175 bgcolor=#d6d6d6
| 33175 Isabellegleeson ||  ||  || March 22, 1998 || Modra || A. Galád, A. Pravda || HYG || align=right | 6.6 km || 
|-id=176 bgcolor=#d6d6d6
| 33176 ||  || — || March 20, 1998 || Xinglong || SCAP || KOR || align=right | 3.7 km || 
|-id=177 bgcolor=#E9E9E9
| 33177 ||  || — || March 26, 1998 || Caussols || ODAS || — || align=right | 4.9 km || 
|-id=178 bgcolor=#E9E9E9
| 33178 ||  || — || March 27, 1998 || Woomera || F. B. Zoltowski || — || align=right | 4.4 km || 
|-id=179 bgcolor=#E9E9E9
| 33179 Arsènewenger ||  ||  || March 29, 1998 || Cocoa || I. P. Griffin || — || align=right | 4.3 km || 
|-id=180 bgcolor=#E9E9E9
| 33180 ||  || — || March 20, 1998 || Socorro || LINEAR || — || align=right | 3.2 km || 
|-id=181 bgcolor=#E9E9E9
| 33181 Aalokpatwa ||  ||  || March 20, 1998 || Socorro || LINEAR || — || align=right | 7.8 km || 
|-id=182 bgcolor=#E9E9E9
| 33182 ||  || — || March 20, 1998 || Socorro || LINEAR || — || align=right | 5.9 km || 
|-id=183 bgcolor=#E9E9E9
| 33183 ||  || — || March 20, 1998 || Socorro || LINEAR || — || align=right | 7.9 km || 
|-id=184 bgcolor=#E9E9E9
| 33184 ||  || — || March 20, 1998 || Socorro || LINEAR || — || align=right | 3.6 km || 
|-id=185 bgcolor=#E9E9E9
| 33185 ||  || — || March 20, 1998 || Socorro || LINEAR || — || align=right | 3.7 km || 
|-id=186 bgcolor=#E9E9E9
| 33186 ||  || — || March 20, 1998 || Socorro || LINEAR || — || align=right | 6.1 km || 
|-id=187 bgcolor=#E9E9E9
| 33187 Pizzolato ||  ||  || March 20, 1998 || Socorro || LINEAR || — || align=right | 4.8 km || 
|-id=188 bgcolor=#d6d6d6
| 33188 Shreya ||  ||  || March 20, 1998 || Socorro || LINEAR || — || align=right | 5.5 km || 
|-id=189 bgcolor=#d6d6d6
| 33189 Ritzdorf ||  ||  || March 20, 1998 || Socorro || LINEAR || — || align=right | 6.2 km || 
|-id=190 bgcolor=#d6d6d6
| 33190 Sigrest ||  ||  || March 20, 1998 || Socorro || LINEAR || EOS || align=right | 5.0 km || 
|-id=191 bgcolor=#d6d6d6
| 33191 Santiagostone ||  ||  || March 20, 1998 || Socorro || LINEAR || EOS || align=right | 3.9 km || 
|-id=192 bgcolor=#d6d6d6
| 33192 ||  || — || March 20, 1998 || Socorro || LINEAR || KOR || align=right | 4.4 km || 
|-id=193 bgcolor=#E9E9E9
| 33193 Emhyr ||  ||  || March 20, 1998 || Socorro || LINEAR || — || align=right | 6.0 km || 
|-id=194 bgcolor=#d6d6d6
| 33194 ||  || — || March 20, 1998 || Socorro || LINEAR || — || align=right | 14 km || 
|-id=195 bgcolor=#E9E9E9
| 33195 Davenyadav ||  ||  || March 20, 1998 || Socorro || LINEAR || — || align=right | 5.0 km || 
|-id=196 bgcolor=#d6d6d6
| 33196 Kaienyang ||  ||  || March 20, 1998 || Socorro || LINEAR || HYG || align=right | 6.4 km || 
|-id=197 bgcolor=#d6d6d6
| 33197 Charlallen ||  ||  || March 20, 1998 || Socorro || LINEAR || THM || align=right | 7.6 km || 
|-id=198 bgcolor=#d6d6d6
| 33198 Mackewicz ||  ||  || March 20, 1998 || Socorro || LINEAR || THM || align=right | 6.0 km || 
|-id=199 bgcolor=#d6d6d6
| 33199 ||  || — || March 20, 1998 || Socorro || LINEAR || — || align=right | 5.7 km || 
|-id=200 bgcolor=#d6d6d6
| 33200 Carasummit ||  ||  || March 20, 1998 || Socorro || LINEAR || HYG || align=right | 8.8 km || 
|}

33201–33300 

|-bgcolor=#E9E9E9
| 33201 Thomasartiss ||  ||  || March 20, 1998 || Socorro || LINEAR || — || align=right | 6.1 km || 
|-id=202 bgcolor=#d6d6d6
| 33202 Davignon ||  ||  || March 20, 1998 || Socorro || LINEAR || — || align=right | 6.3 km || 
|-id=203 bgcolor=#d6d6d6
| 33203 ||  || — || March 20, 1998 || Socorro || LINEAR || KOR || align=right | 4.2 km || 
|-id=204 bgcolor=#d6d6d6
| 33204 ||  || — || March 20, 1998 || Socorro || LINEAR || — || align=right | 6.8 km || 
|-id=205 bgcolor=#d6d6d6
| 33205 Graigmarx ||  ||  || March 20, 1998 || Socorro || LINEAR || THM || align=right | 7.0 km || 
|-id=206 bgcolor=#E9E9E9
| 33206 ||  || — || March 20, 1998 || Socorro || LINEAR || EUN || align=right | 3.8 km || 
|-id=207 bgcolor=#d6d6d6
| 33207 ||  || — || March 20, 1998 || Socorro || LINEAR || — || align=right | 7.5 km || 
|-id=208 bgcolor=#d6d6d6
| 33208 ||  || — || March 20, 1998 || Socorro || LINEAR || — || align=right | 8.2 km || 
|-id=209 bgcolor=#d6d6d6
| 33209 ||  || — || March 20, 1998 || Socorro || LINEAR || — || align=right | 11 km || 
|-id=210 bgcolor=#E9E9E9
| 33210 Johnrobertson ||  ||  || March 20, 1998 || Socorro || LINEAR || — || align=right | 3.2 km || 
|-id=211 bgcolor=#d6d6d6
| 33211 ||  || — || March 30, 1998 || Woomera || F. B. Zoltowski || — || align=right | 9.7 km || 
|-id=212 bgcolor=#d6d6d6
| 33212 ||  || — || March 24, 1998 || Socorro || LINEAR || THM || align=right | 8.1 km || 
|-id=213 bgcolor=#E9E9E9
| 33213 Diggs ||  ||  || March 24, 1998 || Socorro || LINEAR || — || align=right | 5.3 km || 
|-id=214 bgcolor=#E9E9E9
| 33214 ||  || — || March 24, 1998 || Socorro || LINEAR || HNS || align=right | 6.3 km || 
|-id=215 bgcolor=#E9E9E9
| 33215 Garyjones ||  ||  || March 24, 1998 || Socorro || LINEAR || — || align=right | 3.8 km || 
|-id=216 bgcolor=#E9E9E9
| 33216 ||  || — || March 31, 1998 || Socorro || LINEAR || — || align=right | 5.0 km || 
|-id=217 bgcolor=#d6d6d6
| 33217 Bonnybasu ||  ||  || March 31, 1998 || Socorro || LINEAR || — || align=right | 4.4 km || 
|-id=218 bgcolor=#d6d6d6
| 33218 ||  || — || March 31, 1998 || Socorro || LINEAR || EOS || align=right | 7.5 km || 
|-id=219 bgcolor=#E9E9E9
| 33219 De Los Santos ||  ||  || March 31, 1998 || Socorro || LINEAR || DOR || align=right | 5.7 km || 
|-id=220 bgcolor=#d6d6d6
| 33220 ||  || — || March 31, 1998 || Socorro || LINEAR || YAK || align=right | 6.0 km || 
|-id=221 bgcolor=#fefefe
| 33221 Raqueljacobson ||  ||  || March 31, 1998 || Socorro || LINEAR || FLO || align=right | 3.0 km || 
|-id=222 bgcolor=#E9E9E9
| 33222 Gillingham ||  ||  || March 31, 1998 || Socorro || LINEAR || — || align=right | 8.1 km || 
|-id=223 bgcolor=#E9E9E9
| 33223 ||  || — || March 31, 1998 || Socorro || LINEAR || ADE || align=right | 11 km || 
|-id=224 bgcolor=#d6d6d6
| 33224 Lesrogers ||  ||  || March 31, 1998 || Socorro || LINEAR || — || align=right | 4.7 km || 
|-id=225 bgcolor=#d6d6d6
| 33225 ||  || — || March 31, 1998 || Socorro || LINEAR || — || align=right | 6.2 km || 
|-id=226 bgcolor=#d6d6d6
| 33226 Melissamacko ||  ||  || March 20, 1998 || Socorro || LINEAR || — || align=right | 7.9 km || 
|-id=227 bgcolor=#E9E9E9
| 33227 ||  || — || March 20, 1998 || Socorro || LINEAR || — || align=right | 5.5 km || 
|-id=228 bgcolor=#d6d6d6
| 33228 ||  || — || March 20, 1998 || Socorro || LINEAR || EOS || align=right | 8.2 km || 
|-id=229 bgcolor=#E9E9E9
| 33229 ||  || — || March 24, 1998 || Socorro || LINEAR || MAR || align=right | 5.4 km || 
|-id=230 bgcolor=#E9E9E9
| 33230 Libbyrobertson ||  ||  || March 25, 1998 || Socorro || LINEAR || HOF || align=right | 6.0 km || 
|-id=231 bgcolor=#d6d6d6
| 33231 ||  || — || March 24, 1998 || Socorro || LINEAR || — || align=right | 11 km || 
|-id=232 bgcolor=#E9E9E9
| 33232 ||  || — || April 2, 1998 || Socorro || LINEAR || INO || align=right | 3.9 km || 
|-id=233 bgcolor=#E9E9E9
| 33233 ||  || — || April 2, 1998 || Socorro || LINEAR || — || align=right | 4.6 km || 
|-id=234 bgcolor=#fefefe
| 33234 ||  || — || April 2, 1998 || Socorro || LINEAR || — || align=right | 5.7 km || 
|-id=235 bgcolor=#E9E9E9
| 33235 ||  || — || April 2, 1998 || Socorro || LINEAR || MAR || align=right | 4.9 km || 
|-id=236 bgcolor=#E9E9E9
| 33236 ||  || — || April 2, 1998 || Socorro || LINEAR || EUN || align=right | 5.1 km || 
|-id=237 bgcolor=#E9E9E9
| 33237 ||  || — || April 2, 1998 || Socorro || LINEAR || MIT || align=right | 6.8 km || 
|-id=238 bgcolor=#E9E9E9
| 33238 ||  || — || April 2, 1998 || Socorro || LINEAR || MAR || align=right | 5.2 km || 
|-id=239 bgcolor=#d6d6d6
| 33239 ||  || — || April 2, 1998 || Socorro || LINEAR || — || align=right | 11 km || 
|-id=240 bgcolor=#d6d6d6
| 33240 ||  || — || April 20, 1998 || Kleť || Kleť Obs. || — || align=right | 6.3 km || 
|-id=241 bgcolor=#d6d6d6
| 33241 ||  || — || April 21, 1998 || Caussols || ODAS || — || align=right | 8.1 km || 
|-id=242 bgcolor=#d6d6d6
| 33242 ||  || — || April 22, 1998 || Caussols || ODAS || — || align=right | 7.2 km || 
|-id=243 bgcolor=#E9E9E9
| 33243 ||  || — || April 24, 1998 || Haleakala || NEAT || — || align=right | 4.7 km || 
|-id=244 bgcolor=#d6d6d6
| 33244 ||  || — || April 18, 1998 || Socorro || LINEAR || — || align=right | 7.9 km || 
|-id=245 bgcolor=#d6d6d6
| 33245 ||  || — || April 17, 1998 || Kitt Peak || Spacewatch || — || align=right | 4.8 km || 
|-id=246 bgcolor=#E9E9E9
| 33246 ||  || — || April 18, 1998 || Socorro || LINEAR || HOF || align=right | 12 km || 
|-id=247 bgcolor=#E9E9E9
| 33247 Iannacone ||  ||  || April 18, 1998 || Socorro || LINEAR || — || align=right | 6.6 km || 
|-id=248 bgcolor=#E9E9E9
| 33248 Nataliehowell ||  ||  || April 18, 1998 || Socorro || LINEAR || — || align=right | 4.0 km || 
|-id=249 bgcolor=#E9E9E9
| 33249 Pamelasvenson ||  ||  || April 20, 1998 || Socorro || LINEAR || — || align=right | 6.8 km || 
|-id=250 bgcolor=#d6d6d6
| 33250 ||  || — || April 25, 1998 || Haleakala || NEAT || — || align=right | 11 km || 
|-id=251 bgcolor=#d6d6d6
| 33251 ||  || — || April 22, 1998 || Uccle || T. Pauwels || — || align=right | 5.5 km || 
|-id=252 bgcolor=#d6d6d6
| 33252 ||  || — || April 22, 1998 || Kitt Peak || Spacewatch || HYG || align=right | 6.5 km || 
|-id=253 bgcolor=#d6d6d6
| 33253 ||  || — || April 20, 1998 || Socorro || LINEAR || — || align=right | 10 km || 
|-id=254 bgcolor=#E9E9E9
| 33254 Sundaresakumar ||  ||  || April 20, 1998 || Socorro || LINEAR || HOF || align=right | 7.7 km || 
|-id=255 bgcolor=#d6d6d6
| 33255 Kathybush ||  ||  || April 20, 1998 || Socorro || LINEAR || — || align=right | 7.8 km || 
|-id=256 bgcolor=#d6d6d6
| 33256 ||  || — || April 20, 1998 || Socorro || LINEAR || EOS || align=right | 8.8 km || 
|-id=257 bgcolor=#E9E9E9
| 33257 ||  || — || April 20, 1998 || Socorro || LINEAR || — || align=right | 9.3 km || 
|-id=258 bgcolor=#d6d6d6
| 33258 Femariebustos ||  ||  || April 20, 1998 || Socorro || LINEAR || — || align=right | 7.1 km || 
|-id=259 bgcolor=#E9E9E9
| 33259 ||  || — || April 20, 1998 || Socorro || LINEAR || — || align=right | 10 km || 
|-id=260 bgcolor=#E9E9E9
| 33260 ||  || — || April 24, 1998 || Haleakala || NEAT || — || align=right | 7.5 km || 
|-id=261 bgcolor=#E9E9E9
| 33261 Ginagarlie ||  ||  || April 20, 1998 || Socorro || LINEAR || WIT || align=right | 3.2 km || 
|-id=262 bgcolor=#d6d6d6
| 33262 ||  || — || April 25, 1998 || Anderson Mesa || LONEOS || — || align=right | 10 km || 
|-id=263 bgcolor=#d6d6d6
| 33263 Willhutch ||  ||  || April 21, 1998 || Socorro || LINEAR || KOR || align=right | 3.6 km || 
|-id=264 bgcolor=#d6d6d6
| 33264 Maryrogers ||  ||  || April 21, 1998 || Socorro || LINEAR || THM || align=right | 7.8 km || 
|-id=265 bgcolor=#E9E9E9
| 33265 ||  || — || April 21, 1998 || Socorro || LINEAR || MAR || align=right | 5.3 km || 
|-id=266 bgcolor=#d6d6d6
| 33266 ||  || — || April 21, 1998 || Socorro || LINEAR || EOS || align=right | 5.5 km || 
|-id=267 bgcolor=#d6d6d6
| 33267 ||  || — || April 21, 1998 || Socorro || LINEAR || HYG || align=right | 12 km || 
|-id=268 bgcolor=#E9E9E9
| 33268 ||  || — || April 21, 1998 || Socorro || LINEAR || — || align=right | 4.7 km || 
|-id=269 bgcolor=#fefefe
| 33269 Broccoli ||  ||  || April 21, 1998 || Socorro || LINEAR || — || align=right | 2.5 km || 
|-id=270 bgcolor=#d6d6d6
| 33270 Katiecrysup ||  ||  || April 21, 1998 || Socorro || LINEAR || THM || align=right | 9.6 km || 
|-id=271 bgcolor=#E9E9E9
| 33271 ||  || — || April 28, 1998 || Socorro || LINEAR || — || align=right | 6.3 km || 
|-id=272 bgcolor=#d6d6d6
| 33272 ||  || — || April 25, 1998 || La Silla || E. W. Elst || EOS || align=right | 8.1 km || 
|-id=273 bgcolor=#d6d6d6
| 33273 ||  || — || April 23, 1998 || Socorro || LINEAR || — || align=right | 7.3 km || 
|-id=274 bgcolor=#E9E9E9
| 33274 Beaubingham ||  ||  || April 23, 1998 || Socorro || LINEAR || — || align=right | 3.9 km || 
|-id=275 bgcolor=#E9E9E9
| 33275 ||  || — || April 23, 1998 || Socorro || LINEAR || EUN || align=right | 5.2 km || 
|-id=276 bgcolor=#d6d6d6
| 33276 ||  || — || April 23, 1998 || Socorro || LINEAR || EOS || align=right | 5.5 km || 
|-id=277 bgcolor=#d6d6d6
| 33277 ||  || — || April 23, 1998 || Socorro || LINEAR || EOS || align=right | 6.4 km || 
|-id=278 bgcolor=#d6d6d6
| 33278 ||  || — || April 23, 1998 || Socorro || LINEAR || — || align=right | 14 km || 
|-id=279 bgcolor=#d6d6d6
| 33279 ||  || — || April 23, 1998 || Socorro || LINEAR || — || align=right | 9.5 km || 
|-id=280 bgcolor=#d6d6d6
| 33280 ||  || — || April 23, 1998 || Socorro || LINEAR || EOS || align=right | 6.7 km || 
|-id=281 bgcolor=#d6d6d6
| 33281 ||  || — || April 23, 1998 || Socorro || LINEAR || — || align=right | 8.3 km || 
|-id=282 bgcolor=#d6d6d6
| 33282 Arjunramani ||  ||  || April 19, 1998 || Socorro || LINEAR || — || align=right | 8.5 km || 
|-id=283 bgcolor=#d6d6d6
| 33283 ||  || — || April 25, 1998 || La Silla || E. W. Elst || THM || align=right | 7.3 km || 
|-id=284 bgcolor=#E9E9E9
| 33284 ||  || — || April 24, 1998 || Socorro || LINEAR || — || align=right | 6.4 km || 
|-id=285 bgcolor=#d6d6d6
| 33285 ||  || — || May 1, 1998 || Anderson Mesa || LONEOS || EOS || align=right | 6.6 km || 
|-id=286 bgcolor=#d6d6d6
| 33286 || 1998 KA || — || May 16, 1998 || Woomera || F. B. Zoltowski || HYG || align=right | 8.4 km || 
|-id=287 bgcolor=#d6d6d6
| 33287 ||  || — || May 18, 1998 || Anderson Mesa || LONEOS || — || align=right | 12 km || 
|-id=288 bgcolor=#d6d6d6
| 33288 Shixian ||  ||  || May 22, 1998 || Anderson Mesa || LONEOS || ALA || align=right | 10 km || 
|-id=289 bgcolor=#d6d6d6
| 33289 ||  || — || May 18, 1998 || Kitt Peak || Spacewatch || — || align=right | 14 km || 
|-id=290 bgcolor=#d6d6d6
| 33290 Carloszuluaga ||  ||  || May 23, 1998 || Anderson Mesa || LONEOS || URS || align=right | 15 km || 
|-id=291 bgcolor=#E9E9E9
| 33291 ||  || — || May 20, 1998 || Xinglong || SCAP || — || align=right | 2.9 km || 
|-id=292 bgcolor=#d6d6d6
| 33292 ||  || — || May 27, 1998 || Kitt Peak || Spacewatch || LUT || align=right | 18 km || 
|-id=293 bgcolor=#d6d6d6
| 33293 ||  || — || May 22, 1998 || Socorro || LINEAR || EOS || align=right | 5.9 km || 
|-id=294 bgcolor=#d6d6d6
| 33294 ||  || — || May 22, 1998 || Socorro || LINEAR || — || align=right | 5.7 km || 
|-id=295 bgcolor=#d6d6d6
| 33295 ||  || — || May 22, 1998 || Socorro || LINEAR || slow || align=right | 6.9 km || 
|-id=296 bgcolor=#d6d6d6
| 33296 ||  || — || May 27, 1998 || Anderson Mesa || LONEOS || — || align=right | 13 km || 
|-id=297 bgcolor=#d6d6d6
| 33297 ||  || — || May 22, 1998 || Socorro || LINEAR || — || align=right | 12 km || 
|-id=298 bgcolor=#d6d6d6
| 33298 ||  || — || May 22, 1998 || Socorro || LINEAR || EOS || align=right | 6.8 km || 
|-id=299 bgcolor=#d6d6d6
| 33299 ||  || — || May 22, 1998 || Socorro || LINEAR || THM || align=right | 8.4 km || 
|-id=300 bgcolor=#d6d6d6
| 33300 ||  || — || May 22, 1998 || Socorro || LINEAR || — || align=right | 10 km || 
|}

33301–33400 

|-bgcolor=#d6d6d6
| 33301 ||  || — || May 22, 1998 || Socorro || LINEAR || — || align=right | 13 km || 
|-id=302 bgcolor=#d6d6d6
| 33302 ||  || — || May 23, 1998 || Socorro || LINEAR || — || align=right | 8.9 km || 
|-id=303 bgcolor=#E9E9E9
| 33303 ||  || — || May 23, 1998 || Socorro || LINEAR || ADE || align=right | 8.8 km || 
|-id=304 bgcolor=#d6d6d6
| 33304 ||  || — || May 23, 1998 || Socorro || LINEAR || CRO || align=right | 11 km || 
|-id=305 bgcolor=#d6d6d6
| 33305 ||  || — || May 23, 1998 || Socorro || LINEAR || — || align=right | 11 km || 
|-id=306 bgcolor=#d6d6d6
| 33306 ||  || — || May 23, 1998 || Socorro || LINEAR || — || align=right | 11 km || 
|-id=307 bgcolor=#d6d6d6
| 33307 ||  || — || May 23, 1998 || Socorro || LINEAR || MEL || align=right | 11 km || 
|-id=308 bgcolor=#d6d6d6
| 33308 ||  || — || May 23, 1998 || Socorro || LINEAR || — || align=right | 10 km || 
|-id=309 bgcolor=#d6d6d6
| 33309 ||  || — || May 23, 1998 || Socorro || LINEAR || EOS || align=right | 7.5 km || 
|-id=310 bgcolor=#d6d6d6
| 33310 ||  || — || May 23, 1998 || Socorro || LINEAR || 7:4 || align=right | 14 km || 
|-id=311 bgcolor=#d6d6d6
| 33311 ||  || — || May 23, 1998 || Socorro || LINEAR || ALA || align=right | 10 km || 
|-id=312 bgcolor=#d6d6d6
| 33312 ||  || — || May 22, 1998 || Socorro || LINEAR || — || align=right | 11 km || 
|-id=313 bgcolor=#E9E9E9
| 33313 ||  || — || May 23, 1998 || Socorro || LINEAR || WATslow || align=right | 5.3 km || 
|-id=314 bgcolor=#d6d6d6
| 33314 ||  || — || May 23, 1998 || Socorro || LINEAR || EOS || align=right | 7.0 km || 
|-id=315 bgcolor=#d6d6d6
| 33315 ||  || — || May 22, 1998 || Socorro || LINEAR || HYG || align=right | 8.4 km || 
|-id=316 bgcolor=#d6d6d6
| 33316 ||  || — || May 27, 1998 || Socorro || LINEAR || Tj (2.97) || align=right | 12 km || 
|-id=317 bgcolor=#fefefe
| 33317 ||  || — || June 19, 1998 || Socorro || LINEAR || PHO || align=right | 4.2 km || 
|-id=318 bgcolor=#fefefe
| 33318 ||  || — || June 19, 1998 || Socorro || LINEAR || — || align=right | 1.9 km || 
|-id=319 bgcolor=#fefefe
| 33319 Kunqu ||  ||  || June 28, 1998 || La Silla || E. W. Elst || Hslow || align=right | 2.2 km || 
|-id=320 bgcolor=#d6d6d6
| 33320 ||  || — || July 26, 1998 || La Silla || E. W. Elst || — || align=right | 7.2 km || 
|-id=321 bgcolor=#E9E9E9
| 33321 || 1998 QL || — || August 17, 1998 || Woomera || F. B. Zoltowski || AGN || align=right | 3.4 km || 
|-id=322 bgcolor=#fefefe
| 33322 ||  || — || August 19, 1998 || Socorro || LINEAR || H || align=right | 1.8 km || 
|-id=323 bgcolor=#d6d6d6
| 33323 ||  || — || August 23, 1998 || Anderson Mesa || LONEOS || — || align=right | 16 km || 
|-id=324 bgcolor=#fefefe
| 33324 ||  || — || August 28, 1998 || Socorro || LINEAR || H || align=right | 2.0 km || 
|-id=325 bgcolor=#fefefe
| 33325 ||  || — || September 14, 1998 || Socorro || LINEAR || H || align=right | 1.6 km || 
|-id=326 bgcolor=#fefefe
| 33326 ||  || — || September 14, 1998 || Socorro || LINEAR || H || align=right | 1.2 km || 
|-id=327 bgcolor=#fefefe
| 33327 ||  || — || September 14, 1998 || Socorro || LINEAR || H || align=right | 1.2 km || 
|-id=328 bgcolor=#d6d6d6
| 33328 Archanaverma ||  ||  || September 14, 1998 || Socorro || LINEAR || — || align=right | 7.6 km || 
|-id=329 bgcolor=#fefefe
| 33329 Stefanwan ||  ||  || September 14, 1998 || Socorro || LINEAR || FLO || align=right | 3.5 km || 
|-id=330 bgcolor=#fefefe
| 33330 Barèges || 1998 SW ||  || September 16, 1998 || Caussols || ODAS || — || align=right | 1.9 km || 
|-id=331 bgcolor=#fefefe
| 33331 ||  || — || September 23, 1998 || Višnjan Observatory || Višnjan Obs. || — || align=right | 2.3 km || 
|-id=332 bgcolor=#fefefe
| 33332 ||  || — || September 26, 1998 || Socorro || LINEAR || H || align=right | 1.3 km || 
|-id=333 bgcolor=#fefefe
| 33333 ||  || — || September 20, 1998 || La Silla || E. W. Elst || FLO || align=right | 2.3 km || 
|-id=334 bgcolor=#d6d6d6
| 33334 Turon ||  ||  || November 11, 1998 || Caussols || ODAS || — || align=right | 6.1 km || 
|-id=335 bgcolor=#fefefe
| 33335 Guibert ||  ||  || November 11, 1998 || Caussols || ODAS || — || align=right | 1.9 km || 
|-id=336 bgcolor=#E9E9E9
| 33336 ||  || — || November 10, 1998 || Socorro || LINEAR || — || align=right | 8.1 km || 
|-id=337 bgcolor=#fefefe
| 33337 Amberyang ||  ||  || November 10, 1998 || Socorro || LINEAR || — || align=right | 2.1 km || 
|-id=338 bgcolor=#d6d6d6
| 33338 ||  || — || November 10, 1998 || Socorro || LINEAR || — || align=right | 5.8 km || 
|-id=339 bgcolor=#fefefe
| 33339 ||  || — || November 15, 1998 || Catalina || CSS || H || align=right | 1.7 km || 
|-id=340 bgcolor=#C2E0FF
| 33340 ||  || — || November 14, 1998 || Steward Observatory || J. A. Larsen, N. Danzl, A. Gleason || plutino || align=right | 220 km || 
|-id=341 bgcolor=#fefefe
| 33341 ||  || — || November 19, 1998 || Catalina || CSS || Hslow || align=right | 2.5 km || 
|-id=342 bgcolor=#FFC2E0
| 33342 ||  || — || November 25, 1998 || Socorro || LINEAR || ATE +1kmPHA || align=right data-sort-value="0.43" | 430 m || 
|-id=343 bgcolor=#fefefe
| 33343 Madorobin ||  ||  || December 15, 1998 || Caussols || ODAS || V || align=right | 1.6 km || 
|-id=344 bgcolor=#E9E9E9
| 33344 Madymesple ||  ||  || December 15, 1998 || Caussols || ODAS || — || align=right | 6.8 km || 
|-id=345 bgcolor=#E9E9E9
| 33345 Nataliedessay ||  ||  || December 15, 1998 || Caussols || ODAS || — || align=right | 4.7 km || 
|-id=346 bgcolor=#E9E9E9
| 33346 Sabinedevieilhe ||  ||  || December 15, 1998 || Caussols || ODAS || EUN || align=right | 3.2 km || 
|-id=347 bgcolor=#fefefe
| 33347 Maryzhu ||  ||  || December 14, 1998 || Socorro || LINEAR || NYS || align=right | 3.1 km || 
|-id=348 bgcolor=#fefefe
| 33348 Stevelliott ||  ||  || December 14, 1998 || Socorro || LINEAR || FLO || align=right | 3.3 km || 
|-id=349 bgcolor=#fefefe
| 33349 ||  || — || December 14, 1998 || Socorro || LINEAR || — || align=right | 3.8 km || 
|-id=350 bgcolor=#fefefe
| 33350 ||  || — || December 15, 1998 || Socorro || LINEAR || ERI || align=right | 5.7 km || 
|-id=351 bgcolor=#fefefe
| 33351 ||  || — || December 15, 1998 || Socorro || LINEAR || CHL || align=right | 5.3 km || 
|-id=352 bgcolor=#fefefe
| 33352 ||  || — || December 15, 1998 || Socorro || LINEAR || — || align=right | 3.9 km || 
|-id=353 bgcolor=#fefefe
| 33353 Chattopadhyay ||  ||  || December 15, 1998 || Socorro || LINEAR || V || align=right | 1.9 km || 
|-id=354 bgcolor=#fefefe
| 33354 ||  || — || December 22, 1998 || Kitt Peak || Spacewatch || MAS || align=right | 2.3 km || 
|-id=355 bgcolor=#fefefe
| 33355 ||  || — || December 25, 1998 || Kitt Peak || Spacewatch || — || align=right | 1.5 km || 
|-id=356 bgcolor=#fefefe
| 33356 ||  || — || January 9, 1999 || Gekko || T. Kagawa || H || align=right | 3.1 km || 
|-id=357 bgcolor=#fefefe
| 33357 ||  || — || January 12, 1999 || Oizumi || T. Kobayashi || FLO || align=right | 1.5 km || 
|-id=358 bgcolor=#fefefe
| 33358 ||  || — || January 13, 1999 || Oizumi || T. Kobayashi || — || align=right | 2.1 km || 
|-id=359 bgcolor=#d6d6d6
| 33359 ||  || — || January 13, 1999 || Kitt Peak || Spacewatch || — || align=right | 6.8 km || 
|-id=360 bgcolor=#fefefe
| 33360 ||  || — || January 15, 1999 || Monte Agliale || S. Donati || MAS || align=right | 4.4 km || 
|-id=361 bgcolor=#fefefe
| 33361 ||  || — || January 15, 1999 || Caussols || ODAS || — || align=right | 1.6 km || 
|-id=362 bgcolor=#fefefe
| 33362 ||  || — || January 16, 1999 || Višnjan Observatory || K. Korlević || — || align=right | 5.0 km || 
|-id=363 bgcolor=#E9E9E9
| 33363 ||  || — || January 19, 1999 || Caussols || ODAS || — || align=right | 4.3 km || 
|-id=364 bgcolor=#fefefe
| 33364 ||  || — || January 20, 1999 || Višnjan Observatory || K. Korlević || V || align=right | 1.9 km || 
|-id=365 bgcolor=#fefefe
| 33365 ||  || — || January 20, 1999 || Caussols || ODAS || FLO || align=right | 2.8 km || 
|-id=366 bgcolor=#fefefe
| 33366 ||  || — || January 21, 1999 || Oizumi || T. Kobayashi || — || align=right | 2.8 km || 
|-id=367 bgcolor=#fefefe
| 33367 ||  || — || January 22, 1999 || Višnjan Observatory || K. Korlević || V || align=right | 1.7 km || 
|-id=368 bgcolor=#fefefe
| 33368 ||  || — || January 22, 1999 || Višnjan Observatory || K. Korlević || — || align=right | 3.3 km || 
|-id=369 bgcolor=#fefefe
| 33369 ||  || — || January 20, 1999 || Caussols || ODAS || V || align=right | 2.1 km || 
|-id=370 bgcolor=#E9E9E9
| 33370 ||  || — || January 20, 1999 || Caussols || ODAS || — || align=right | 3.7 km || 
|-id=371 bgcolor=#fefefe
| 33371 ||  || — || January 21, 1999 || Caussols || ODAS || — || align=right | 2.3 km || 
|-id=372 bgcolor=#fefefe
| 33372 Jonathanchung ||  ||  || January 18, 1999 || Socorro || LINEAR || NYS || align=right | 3.1 km || 
|-id=373 bgcolor=#fefefe
| 33373 ||  || — || January 17, 1999 || Kitt Peak || Spacewatch || — || align=right | 2.1 km || 
|-id=374 bgcolor=#fefefe
| 33374 ||  || — || February 6, 1999 || Višnjan Observatory || K. Korlević || NYS || align=right | 2.6 km || 
|-id=375 bgcolor=#fefefe
| 33375 ||  || — || February 9, 1999 || Xinglong || SCAP || — || align=right | 2.9 km || 
|-id=376 bgcolor=#fefefe
| 33376 Medi ||  ||  || February 6, 1999 || Pianoro || V. Goretti || — || align=right | 4.8 km || 
|-id=377 bgcolor=#fefefe
| 33377 Večerníček ||  ||  || February 12, 1999 || Ondřejov || P. Pravec || — || align=right | 1.5 km || 
|-id=378 bgcolor=#fefefe
| 33378 ||  || — || February 13, 1999 || Gekko || T. Kagawa || FLO || align=right | 2.3 km || 
|-id=379 bgcolor=#fefefe
| 33379 Rohandalvi ||  ||  || February 10, 1999 || Socorro || LINEAR || — || align=right | 1.9 km || 
|-id=380 bgcolor=#fefefe
| 33380 ||  || — || February 10, 1999 || Socorro || LINEAR || — || align=right | 2.2 km || 
|-id=381 bgcolor=#fefefe
| 33381 ||  || — || February 10, 1999 || Socorro || LINEAR || — || align=right | 2.8 km || 
|-id=382 bgcolor=#fefefe
| 33382 Indranidas ||  ||  || February 10, 1999 || Socorro || LINEAR || NYS || align=right | 5.8 km || 
|-id=383 bgcolor=#fefefe
| 33383 Edupuganti ||  ||  || February 10, 1999 || Socorro || LINEAR || V || align=right | 2.3 km || 
|-id=384 bgcolor=#fefefe
| 33384 Jacyfang ||  ||  || February 10, 1999 || Socorro || LINEAR || FLO || align=right | 2.4 km || 
|-id=385 bgcolor=#fefefe
| 33385 ||  || — || February 10, 1999 || Socorro || LINEAR || V || align=right | 3.7 km || 
|-id=386 bgcolor=#fefefe
| 33386 ||  || — || February 10, 1999 || Socorro || LINEAR || — || align=right | 2.3 km || 
|-id=387 bgcolor=#fefefe
| 33387 ||  || — || February 10, 1999 || Socorro || LINEAR || — || align=right | 2.9 km || 
|-id=388 bgcolor=#fefefe
| 33388 ||  || — || February 10, 1999 || Socorro || LINEAR || — || align=right | 4.1 km || 
|-id=389 bgcolor=#fefefe
| 33389 Isairisgreco ||  ||  || February 10, 1999 || Socorro || LINEAR || FLO || align=right | 3.8 km || 
|-id=390 bgcolor=#fefefe
| 33390 Hajlasz ||  ||  || February 10, 1999 || Socorro || LINEAR || NYS || align=right | 6.3 km || 
|-id=391 bgcolor=#fefefe
| 33391 ||  || — || February 10, 1999 || Socorro || LINEAR || — || align=right | 2.6 km || 
|-id=392 bgcolor=#fefefe
| 33392 Blakehord ||  ||  || February 10, 1999 || Socorro || LINEAR || FLO || align=right | 2.0 km || 
|-id=393 bgcolor=#fefefe
| 33393 Khandelwal ||  ||  || February 10, 1999 || Socorro || LINEAR || — || align=right | 4.9 km || 
|-id=394 bgcolor=#fefefe
| 33394 Nathaniellee ||  ||  || February 10, 1999 || Socorro || LINEAR || NYS || align=right | 3.1 km || 
|-id=395 bgcolor=#fefefe
| 33395 Dylanli ||  ||  || February 10, 1999 || Socorro || LINEAR || NYS || align=right | 1.6 km || 
|-id=396 bgcolor=#fefefe
| 33396 Vrindamadan ||  ||  || February 10, 1999 || Socorro || LINEAR || — || align=right | 2.2 km || 
|-id=397 bgcolor=#fefefe
| 33397 Prathiknaidu ||  ||  || February 10, 1999 || Socorro || LINEAR || V || align=right | 1.9 km || 
|-id=398 bgcolor=#E9E9E9
| 33398 ||  || — || February 10, 1999 || Socorro || LINEAR || — || align=right | 4.5 km || 
|-id=399 bgcolor=#fefefe
| 33399 Emilyann ||  ||  || February 10, 1999 || Socorro || LINEAR || — || align=right | 1.9 km || 
|-id=400 bgcolor=#E9E9E9
| 33400 Laurapierson ||  ||  || February 10, 1999 || Socorro || LINEAR || — || align=right | 3.9 km || 
|}

33401–33500 

|-bgcolor=#fefefe
| 33401 Radiya-Dixit ||  ||  || February 12, 1999 || Socorro || LINEAR || FLO || align=right | 2.2 km || 
|-id=402 bgcolor=#E9E9E9
| 33402 Canizares ||  ||  || February 12, 1999 || Socorro || LINEAR || — || align=right | 3.4 km || 
|-id=403 bgcolor=#fefefe
| 33403 ||  || — || February 12, 1999 || Socorro || LINEAR || FLO || align=right | 1.5 km || 
|-id=404 bgcolor=#d6d6d6
| 33404 ||  || — || February 12, 1999 || Socorro || LINEAR || HYG || align=right | 9.5 km || 
|-id=405 bgcolor=#fefefe
| 33405 Rekhtman ||  ||  || February 12, 1999 || Socorro || LINEAR || — || align=right | 1.9 km || 
|-id=406 bgcolor=#fefefe
| 33406 Saltzman ||  ||  || February 12, 1999 || Socorro || LINEAR || — || align=right | 5.4 km || 
|-id=407 bgcolor=#E9E9E9
| 33407 ||  || — || February 12, 1999 || Socorro || LINEAR || — || align=right | 5.3 km || 
|-id=408 bgcolor=#fefefe
| 33408 Mananshah ||  ||  || February 12, 1999 || Socorro || LINEAR || — || align=right | 2.2 km || 
|-id=409 bgcolor=#fefefe
| 33409 ||  || — || February 12, 1999 || Socorro || LINEAR || — || align=right | 2.4 km || 
|-id=410 bgcolor=#fefefe
| 33410 ||  || — || February 10, 1999 || Socorro || LINEAR || — || align=right | 2.5 km || 
|-id=411 bgcolor=#fefefe
| 33411 ||  || — || February 10, 1999 || Socorro || LINEAR || NYS || align=right | 1.2 km || 
|-id=412 bgcolor=#fefefe
| 33412 Arjunsubra ||  ||  || February 10, 1999 || Socorro || LINEAR || — || align=right | 6.5 km || 
|-id=413 bgcolor=#fefefe
| 33413 Alecsun ||  ||  || February 10, 1999 || Socorro || LINEAR || FLO || align=right | 1.7 km || 
|-id=414 bgcolor=#fefefe
| 33414 Jessicatian ||  ||  || February 10, 1999 || Socorro || LINEAR || — || align=right | 2.2 km || 
|-id=415 bgcolor=#fefefe
| 33415 Felixwang ||  ||  || February 10, 1999 || Socorro || LINEAR || — || align=right | 2.2 km || 
|-id=416 bgcolor=#fefefe
| 33416 ||  || — || February 10, 1999 || Socorro || LINEAR || — || align=right | 3.1 km || 
|-id=417 bgcolor=#fefefe
| 33417 ||  || — || February 12, 1999 || Socorro || LINEAR || — || align=right | 3.6 km || 
|-id=418 bgcolor=#fefefe
| 33418 Jacksonweaver ||  ||  || February 12, 1999 || Socorro || LINEAR || — || align=right | 2.3 km || 
|-id=419 bgcolor=#fefefe
| 33419 Wellman ||  ||  || February 12, 1999 || Socorro || LINEAR || — || align=right | 3.5 km || 
|-id=420 bgcolor=#fefefe
| 33420 Derekwoo ||  ||  || February 12, 1999 || Socorro || LINEAR || — || align=right | 3.9 km || 
|-id=421 bgcolor=#fefefe
| 33421 Byronxu ||  ||  || February 13, 1999 || Socorro || LINEAR || — || align=right | 2.6 km || 
|-id=422 bgcolor=#d6d6d6
| 33422 ||  || — || February 8, 1999 || Kitt Peak || Spacewatch || KOR || align=right | 3.5 km || 
|-id=423 bgcolor=#fefefe
| 33423 || 1999 DK || — || February 16, 1999 || Caussols || ODAS || FLO || align=right | 2.6 km || 
|-id=424 bgcolor=#fefefe
| 33424 ||  || — || February 16, 1999 || Socorro || LINEAR || PHO || align=right | 3.5 km || 
|-id=425 bgcolor=#fefefe
| 33425 ||  || — || February 19, 1999 || Oizumi || T. Kobayashi || — || align=right | 2.4 km || 
|-id=426 bgcolor=#fefefe
| 33426 ||  || — || February 19, 1999 || Oizumi || T. Kobayashi || V || align=right | 2.1 km || 
|-id=427 bgcolor=#fefefe
| 33427 ||  || — || February 21, 1999 || Oizumi || T. Kobayashi || FLO || align=right | 2.3 km || 
|-id=428 bgcolor=#fefefe
| 33428 ||  || — || February 18, 1999 || Višnjan Observatory || K. Korlević, M. Jurić || — || align=right | 2.2 km || 
|-id=429 bgcolor=#d6d6d6
| 33429 ||  || — || February 23, 1999 || Višnjan Observatory || K. Korlević, M. Jurić || — || align=right | 6.7 km || 
|-id=430 bgcolor=#fefefe
| 33430 || 1999 EH || — || March 7, 1999 || Reedy Creek || J. Broughton || — || align=right | 2.4 km || 
|-id=431 bgcolor=#fefefe
| 33431 || 1999 EK || — || March 9, 1999 || Zeno || T. Stafford || NYS || align=right | 3.3 km || 
|-id=432 bgcolor=#d6d6d6
| 33432 ||  || — || March 15, 1999 || Prescott || P. G. Comba || — || align=right | 6.0 km || 
|-id=433 bgcolor=#fefefe
| 33433 Maurilia ||  ||  || March 14, 1999 || Gnosca || S. Sposetti || — || align=right | 3.3 km || 
|-id=434 bgcolor=#d6d6d6
| 33434 Scottmanley || 1999 FU ||  || March 17, 1999 || Caussols || ODAS || KOR || align=right | 4.6 km || 
|-id=435 bgcolor=#E9E9E9
| 33435 ||  || — || March 16, 1999 || Kitt Peak || Spacewatch || MIS || align=right | 7.6 km || 
|-id=436 bgcolor=#E9E9E9
| 33436 ||  || — || March 20, 1999 || Caussols || ODAS || — || align=right | 8.4 km || 
|-id=437 bgcolor=#fefefe
| 33437 ||  || — || March 22, 1999 || Anderson Mesa || LONEOS || NYS || align=right | 2.1 km || 
|-id=438 bgcolor=#fefefe
| 33438 ||  || — || March 22, 1999 || Anderson Mesa || LONEOS || EUT || align=right | 2.1 km || 
|-id=439 bgcolor=#E9E9E9
| 33439 ||  || — || March 20, 1999 || Anderson Mesa || LONEOS || — || align=right | 3.9 km || 
|-id=440 bgcolor=#fefefe
| 33440 Nicholasprato ||  ||  || March 22, 1999 || Anderson Mesa || LONEOS || V || align=right | 2.3 km || 
|-id=441 bgcolor=#fefefe
| 33441 Catherineprato ||  ||  || March 22, 1999 || Anderson Mesa || LONEOS || V || align=right | 2.5 km || 
|-id=442 bgcolor=#E9E9E9
| 33442 ||  || — || March 22, 1999 || Anderson Mesa || LONEOS || — || align=right | 3.3 km || 
|-id=443 bgcolor=#E9E9E9
| 33443 ||  || — || March 22, 1999 || Anderson Mesa || LONEOS || — || align=right | 5.8 km || 
|-id=444 bgcolor=#fefefe
| 33444 ||  || — || March 22, 1999 || Anderson Mesa || LONEOS || — || align=right | 2.4 km || 
|-id=445 bgcolor=#d6d6d6
| 33445 ||  || — || March 23, 1999 || Gnosca || S. Sposetti || KOR || align=right | 4.3 km || 
|-id=446 bgcolor=#fefefe
| 33446 Michaelyang ||  ||  || March 19, 1999 || Socorro || LINEAR || — || align=right | 1.7 km || 
|-id=447 bgcolor=#fefefe
| 33447 ||  || — || March 19, 1999 || Socorro || LINEAR || FLO || align=right | 3.7 km || 
|-id=448 bgcolor=#fefefe
| 33448 Aaronyeiser ||  ||  || March 19, 1999 || Socorro || LINEAR || — || align=right | 2.7 km || 
|-id=449 bgcolor=#E9E9E9
| 33449 ||  || — || March 19, 1999 || Socorro || LINEAR || — || align=right | 2.9 km || 
|-id=450 bgcolor=#fefefe
| 33450 Allender ||  ||  || March 19, 1999 || Socorro || LINEAR || — || align=right | 3.3 km || 
|-id=451 bgcolor=#fefefe
| 33451 Michaelarney ||  ||  || March 19, 1999 || Socorro || LINEAR || NYS || align=right | 6.2 km || 
|-id=452 bgcolor=#E9E9E9
| 33452 Olivebryan ||  ||  || March 19, 1999 || Socorro || LINEAR || — || align=right | 5.7 km || 
|-id=453 bgcolor=#fefefe
| 33453 Townley ||  ||  || March 19, 1999 || Socorro || LINEAR || FLO || align=right | 2.4 km || 
|-id=454 bgcolor=#fefefe
| 33454 Neilclaffey ||  ||  || March 19, 1999 || Socorro || LINEAR || FLO || align=right | 3.0 km || 
|-id=455 bgcolor=#fefefe
| 33455 Coakley ||  ||  || March 19, 1999 || Socorro || LINEAR || V || align=right | 2.0 km || 
|-id=456 bgcolor=#fefefe
| 33456 Ericacurran ||  ||  || March 19, 1999 || Socorro || LINEAR || FLO || align=right | 3.3 km || 
|-id=457 bgcolor=#fefefe
| 33457 Cutillo ||  ||  || March 19, 1999 || Socorro || LINEAR || FLO || align=right | 3.0 km || 
|-id=458 bgcolor=#fefefe
| 33458 Fialkow ||  ||  || March 19, 1999 || Socorro || LINEAR || — || align=right | 2.4 km || 
|-id=459 bgcolor=#fefefe
| 33459 ||  || — || March 19, 1999 || Socorro || LINEAR || MAS || align=right | 2.0 km || 
|-id=460 bgcolor=#fefefe
| 33460 ||  || — || March 19, 1999 || Socorro || LINEAR || NYS || align=right | 3.3 km || 
|-id=461 bgcolor=#fefefe
| 33461 ||  || — || March 19, 1999 || Socorro || LINEAR || — || align=right | 2.1 km || 
|-id=462 bgcolor=#fefefe
| 33462 Tophergee ||  ||  || March 19, 1999 || Socorro || LINEAR || — || align=right | 3.5 km || 
|-id=463 bgcolor=#fefefe
| 33463 Bettinagregg ||  ||  || March 19, 1999 || Socorro || LINEAR || V || align=right | 2.9 km || 
|-id=464 bgcolor=#fefefe
| 33464 Melahudock ||  ||  || March 19, 1999 || Socorro || LINEAR || — || align=right | 2.9 km || 
|-id=465 bgcolor=#fefefe
| 33465 ||  || — || March 23, 1999 || Višnjan Observatory || K. Korlević || MAS || align=right | 2.8 km || 
|-id=466 bgcolor=#fefefe
| 33466 Thomaslarson ||  ||  || March 19, 1999 || Socorro || LINEAR || V || align=right | 1.7 km || 
|-id=467 bgcolor=#E9E9E9
| 33467 Johnlieb ||  ||  || March 19, 1999 || Socorro || LINEAR || — || align=right | 2.9 km || 
|-id=468 bgcolor=#fefefe
| 33468 Nelsoneric ||  ||  || March 20, 1999 || Socorro || LINEAR || — || align=right | 3.5 km || 
|-id=469 bgcolor=#d6d6d6
| 33469 ||  || — || March 20, 1999 || Socorro || LINEAR || EOS || align=right | 4.2 km || 
|-id=470 bgcolor=#E9E9E9
| 33470 ||  || — || March 20, 1999 || Socorro || LINEAR || HOF || align=right | 10 km || 
|-id=471 bgcolor=#fefefe
| 33471 Ozuna ||  ||  || March 20, 1999 || Socorro || LINEAR || — || align=right | 2.9 km || 
|-id=472 bgcolor=#fefefe
| 33472 Yunorperalta ||  ||  || March 20, 1999 || Socorro || LINEAR || V || align=right | 2.4 km || 
|-id=473 bgcolor=#fefefe
| 33473 Porterfield ||  ||  || March 20, 1999 || Socorro || LINEAR || V || align=right | 2.0 km || 
|-id=474 bgcolor=#fefefe
| 33474 ||  || — || March 20, 1999 || Socorro || LINEAR || — || align=right | 3.1 km || 
|-id=475 bgcolor=#fefefe
| 33475 ||  || — || March 28, 1999 || Višnjan Observatory || K. Korlević || — || align=right | 3.9 km || 
|-id=476 bgcolor=#fefefe
| 33476 Gilanareiss ||  ||  || March 20, 1999 || Socorro || LINEAR || V || align=right | 3.4 km || 
|-id=477 bgcolor=#fefefe
| 33477 ||  || — || March 27, 1999 || Xinglong || SCAP || V || align=right | 2.0 km || 
|-id=478 bgcolor=#fefefe
| 33478 Deniselivon || 1999 GB ||  || April 2, 1999 || Wykrota || C. Jacques || FLO || align=right | 2.1 km || 
|-id=479 bgcolor=#d6d6d6
| 33479 || 1999 GO || — || April 5, 1999 || Višnjan Observatory || K. Korlević || THM || align=right | 11 km || 
|-id=480 bgcolor=#fefefe
| 33480 Bartolucci ||  ||  || April 4, 1999 || San Marcello || L. Tesi, M. Tombelli || — || align=right | 2.8 km || 
|-id=481 bgcolor=#fefefe
| 33481 ||  || — || April 7, 1999 || Oizumi || T. Kobayashi || — || align=right | 2.3 km || 
|-id=482 bgcolor=#E9E9E9
| 33482 ||  || — || April 10, 1999 || Višnjan Observatory || K. Korlević || — || align=right | 3.2 km || 
|-id=483 bgcolor=#fefefe
| 33483 ||  || — || April 11, 1999 || Fountain Hills || C. W. Juels || — || align=right | 3.1 km || 
|-id=484 bgcolor=#E9E9E9
| 33484 ||  || — || April 7, 1999 || Anderson Mesa || LONEOS || — || align=right | 4.9 km || 
|-id=485 bgcolor=#fefefe
| 33485 ||  || — || April 9, 1999 || Anderson Mesa || LONEOS || V || align=right | 2.3 km || 
|-id=486 bgcolor=#fefefe
| 33486 ||  || — || April 10, 1999 || Anderson Mesa || LONEOS || — || align=right | 3.5 km || 
|-id=487 bgcolor=#fefefe
| 33487 ||  || — || April 10, 1999 || Anderson Mesa || LONEOS || FLO || align=right | 2.6 km || 
|-id=488 bgcolor=#E9E9E9
| 33488 ||  || — || April 10, 1999 || Anderson Mesa || LONEOS || — || align=right | 7.8 km || 
|-id=489 bgcolor=#E9E9E9
| 33489 Myungjinkim ||  ||  || April 10, 1999 || Anderson Mesa || LONEOS || MAR || align=right | 6.0 km || 
|-id=490 bgcolor=#fefefe
| 33490 ||  || — || April 11, 1999 || Anderson Mesa || LONEOS || — || align=right | 3.8 km || 
|-id=491 bgcolor=#fefefe
| 33491 ||  || — || April 11, 1999 || Anderson Mesa || LONEOS || V || align=right | 3.1 km || 
|-id=492 bgcolor=#fefefe
| 33492 Christirogers ||  ||  || April 15, 1999 || Socorro || LINEAR || V || align=right | 2.8 km || 
|-id=493 bgcolor=#E9E9E9
| 33493 ||  || — || April 15, 1999 || Socorro || LINEAR || — || align=right | 9.1 km || 
|-id=494 bgcolor=#E9E9E9
| 33494 ||  || — || April 15, 1999 || Socorro || LINEAR || — || align=right | 3.7 km || 
|-id=495 bgcolor=#fefefe
| 33495 Schaferjames ||  ||  || April 15, 1999 || Socorro || LINEAR || — || align=right | 2.9 km || 
|-id=496 bgcolor=#fefefe
| 33496 ||  || — || April 15, 1999 || Socorro || LINEAR || — || align=right | 3.1 km || 
|-id=497 bgcolor=#E9E9E9
| 33497 ||  || — || April 15, 1999 || Socorro || LINEAR || — || align=right | 7.3 km || 
|-id=498 bgcolor=#fefefe
| 33498 Juliesmith ||  ||  || April 15, 1999 || Socorro || LINEAR || — || align=right | 4.6 km || 
|-id=499 bgcolor=#fefefe
| 33499 Stanton ||  ||  || April 15, 1999 || Socorro || LINEAR || — || align=right | 2.3 km || 
|-id=500 bgcolor=#E9E9E9
| 33500 ||  || — || April 15, 1999 || Socorro || LINEAR || EUN || align=right | 4.6 km || 
|}

33501–33600 

|-bgcolor=#fefefe
| 33501 Juliethompson ||  ||  || April 15, 1999 || Socorro || LINEAR || — || align=right | 4.0 km || 
|-id=502 bgcolor=#fefefe
| 33502 Janetwaldeck ||  ||  || April 15, 1999 || Socorro || LINEAR || NYS || align=right | 2.4 km || 
|-id=503 bgcolor=#fefefe
| 33503 Dasilvaborges ||  ||  || April 15, 1999 || Socorro || LINEAR || — || align=right | 6.6 km || 
|-id=504 bgcolor=#fefefe
| 33504 Rebrouwer ||  ||  || April 15, 1999 || Socorro || LINEAR || NYS || align=right | 1.6 km || 
|-id=505 bgcolor=#fefefe
| 33505 ||  || — || April 7, 1999 || Socorro || LINEAR || — || align=right | 2.4 km || 
|-id=506 bgcolor=#fefefe
| 33506 ||  || — || April 6, 1999 || Socorro || LINEAR || — || align=right | 1.9 km || 
|-id=507 bgcolor=#E9E9E9
| 33507 ||  || — || April 6, 1999 || Socorro || LINEAR || — || align=right | 3.9 km || 
|-id=508 bgcolor=#E9E9E9
| 33508 Drewnik ||  ||  || April 6, 1999 || Socorro || LINEAR || — || align=right | 3.3 km || 
|-id=509 bgcolor=#fefefe
| 33509 Mogilny ||  ||  || April 7, 1999 || Socorro || LINEAR || — || align=right | 1.9 km || 
|-id=510 bgcolor=#fefefe
| 33510 ||  || — || April 7, 1999 || Socorro || LINEAR || — || align=right | 1.8 km || 
|-id=511 bgcolor=#fefefe
| 33511 Austinwang ||  ||  || April 12, 1999 || Socorro || LINEAR || V || align=right | 2.8 km || 
|-id=512 bgcolor=#fefefe
| 33512 ||  || — || April 12, 1999 || Socorro || LINEAR || V || align=right | 3.3 km || 
|-id=513 bgcolor=#fefefe
| 33513 ||  || — || April 6, 1999 || Socorro || LINEAR || — || align=right | 4.0 km || 
|-id=514 bgcolor=#fefefe
| 33514 Changpeihsuan ||  ||  || April 6, 1999 || Socorro || LINEAR || V || align=right | 3.6 km || 
|-id=515 bgcolor=#E9E9E9
| 33515 Linbohan ||  ||  || April 6, 1999 || Socorro || LINEAR || — || align=right | 3.7 km || 
|-id=516 bgcolor=#fefefe
| 33516 Timonen ||  ||  || April 6, 1999 || Socorro || LINEAR || FLO || align=right | 2.6 km || 
|-id=517 bgcolor=#E9E9E9
| 33517 Paulfoltin ||  ||  || April 6, 1999 || Socorro || LINEAR || DOR || align=right | 7.1 km || 
|-id=518 bgcolor=#fefefe
| 33518 Stoetzer ||  ||  || April 6, 1999 || Socorro || LINEAR || — || align=right | 2.7 km || 
|-id=519 bgcolor=#E9E9E9
| 33519 ||  || — || April 12, 1999 || Socorro || LINEAR || GEF || align=right | 4.7 km || 
|-id=520 bgcolor=#fefefe
| 33520 Ichige ||  ||  || April 12, 1999 || Socorro || LINEAR || — || align=right | 3.0 km || 
|-id=521 bgcolor=#E9E9E9
| 33521 ||  || — || April 12, 1999 || Socorro || LINEAR || EUN || align=right | 4.6 km || 
|-id=522 bgcolor=#fefefe
| 33522 Chizumimaeta ||  ||  || April 12, 1999 || Socorro || LINEAR || V || align=right | 2.3 km || 
|-id=523 bgcolor=#fefefe
| 33523 Warashina ||  ||  || April 12, 1999 || Socorro || LINEAR || — || align=right | 2.3 km || 
|-id=524 bgcolor=#E9E9E9
| 33524 ||  || — || April 7, 1999 || Anderson Mesa || LONEOS || HEN || align=right | 3.3 km || 
|-id=525 bgcolor=#fefefe
| 33525 Teresinha ||  ||  || April 11, 1999 || Anderson Mesa || LONEOS || FLO || align=right | 4.0 km || 
|-id=526 bgcolor=#fefefe
| 33526 ||  || — || April 6, 1999 || Kitt Peak || Spacewatch || — || align=right | 2.8 km || 
|-id=527 bgcolor=#fefefe
| 33527 ||  || — || April 7, 1999 || Kitt Peak || Spacewatch || FLO || align=right | 2.9 km || 
|-id=528 bgcolor=#fefefe
| 33528 Jinzeman || 1999 HL ||  || April 17, 1999 || Ondřejov || P. Pravec || — || align=right | 2.9 km || 
|-id=529 bgcolor=#fefefe
| 33529 Henden ||  ||  || April 19, 1999 || Fountain Hills || C. W. Juels || — || align=right | 4.1 km || 
|-id=530 bgcolor=#fefefe
| 33530 ||  || — || April 19, 1999 || Reedy Creek || J. Broughton || — || align=right | 2.3 km || 
|-id=531 bgcolor=#fefefe
| 33531 ||  || — || April 20, 1999 || Višnjan Observatory || K. Korlević, M. Jurić || — || align=right | 3.1 km || 
|-id=532 bgcolor=#fefefe
| 33532 Gabriellacoli ||  ||  || April 18, 1999 || San Marcello || A. Boattini, L. Tesi || — || align=right | 2.3 km || 
|-id=533 bgcolor=#fefefe
| 33533 ||  || — || April 19, 1999 || Woomera || F. B. Zoltowski || — || align=right | 2.5 km || 
|-id=534 bgcolor=#fefefe
| 33534 Meiyamamura ||  ||  || April 17, 1999 || Socorro || LINEAR || NYS || align=right | 2.1 km || 
|-id=535 bgcolor=#fefefe
| 33535 Alshaikh ||  ||  || April 17, 1999 || Socorro || LINEAR || NYS || align=right | 6.8 km || 
|-id=536 bgcolor=#fefefe
| 33536 Charpugdee ||  ||  || April 17, 1999 || Socorro || LINEAR || CLA || align=right | 5.5 km || 
|-id=537 bgcolor=#E9E9E9
| 33537 Doungnga ||  ||  || April 17, 1999 || Socorro || LINEAR || — || align=right | 8.0 km || 
|-id=538 bgcolor=#fefefe
| 33538 Jaredbergen ||  ||  || April 17, 1999 || Socorro || LINEAR || — || align=right | 3.8 km || 
|-id=539 bgcolor=#fefefe
| 33539 Elenaberman ||  ||  || April 17, 1999 || Socorro || LINEAR || V || align=right | 1.8 km || 
|-id=540 bgcolor=#fefefe
| 33540 ||  || — || May 7, 1999 || Nachi-Katsuura || Y. Shimizu, T. Urata || — || align=right | 9.2 km || 
|-id=541 bgcolor=#E9E9E9
| 33541 ||  || — || May 11, 1999 || Nachi-Katsuura || Y. Shimizu, T. Urata || — || align=right | 3.7 km || 
|-id=542 bgcolor=#E9E9E9
| 33542 ||  || — || May 12, 1999 || Socorro || LINEAR || — || align=right | 3.9 km || 
|-id=543 bgcolor=#d6d6d6
| 33543 ||  || — || May 13, 1999 || Reedy Creek || J. Broughton || — || align=right | 6.2 km || 
|-id=544 bgcolor=#E9E9E9
| 33544 Jerold ||  ||  || May 15, 1999 || Fountain Hills || C. W. Juels || — || align=right | 4.0 km || 
|-id=545 bgcolor=#E9E9E9
| 33545 ||  || — || May 8, 1999 || Catalina || CSS || — || align=right | 5.7 km || 
|-id=546 bgcolor=#d6d6d6
| 33546 ||  || — || May 8, 1999 || Catalina || CSS || — || align=right | 9.8 km || 
|-id=547 bgcolor=#E9E9E9
| 33547 ||  || — || May 15, 1999 || Catalina || CSS || — || align=right | 3.5 km || 
|-id=548 bgcolor=#E9E9E9
| 33548 ||  || — || May 10, 1999 || Višnjan Observatory || K. Korlević || MAR || align=right | 4.8 km || 
|-id=549 bgcolor=#E9E9E9
| 33549 ||  || — || May 10, 1999 || Socorro || LINEAR || — || align=right | 3.8 km || 
|-id=550 bgcolor=#E9E9E9
| 33550 Blackburn ||  ||  || May 10, 1999 || Socorro || LINEAR || — || align=right | 4.4 km || 
|-id=551 bgcolor=#E9E9E9
| 33551 ||  || — || May 12, 1999 || Socorro || LINEAR || — || align=right | 3.1 km || 
|-id=552 bgcolor=#E9E9E9
| 33552 ||  || — || May 15, 1999 || Catalina || CSS || — || align=right | 8.9 km || 
|-id=553 bgcolor=#E9E9E9
| 33553 Nagai ||  ||  || May 11, 1999 || Nanyo || T. Okuni || — || align=right | 3.3 km || 
|-id=554 bgcolor=#d6d6d6
| 33554 ||  || — || May 10, 1999 || Socorro || LINEAR || — || align=right | 5.3 km || 
|-id=555 bgcolor=#fefefe
| 33555 Nataliebush ||  ||  || May 10, 1999 || Socorro || LINEAR || FLO || align=right | 2.2 km || 
|-id=556 bgcolor=#fefefe
| 33556 Brennanclark ||  ||  || May 10, 1999 || Socorro || LINEAR || — || align=right | 3.1 km || 
|-id=557 bgcolor=#E9E9E9
| 33557 ||  || — || May 10, 1999 || Socorro || LINEAR || EUN || align=right | 5.3 km || 
|-id=558 bgcolor=#fefefe
| 33558 ||  || — || May 10, 1999 || Socorro || LINEAR || FLO || align=right | 2.3 km || 
|-id=559 bgcolor=#fefefe
| 33559 Laurencooper ||  ||  || May 10, 1999 || Socorro || LINEAR || FLO || align=right | 4.2 km || 
|-id=560 bgcolor=#fefefe
| 33560 D'Alessandro ||  ||  || May 10, 1999 || Socorro || LINEAR || V || align=right | 2.7 km || 
|-id=561 bgcolor=#fefefe
| 33561 Brianjasondu ||  ||  || May 10, 1999 || Socorro || LINEAR || — || align=right | 1.7 km || 
|-id=562 bgcolor=#fefefe
| 33562 Amydunphy ||  ||  || May 10, 1999 || Socorro || LINEAR || — || align=right | 3.5 km || 
|-id=563 bgcolor=#E9E9E9
| 33563 ||  || — || May 10, 1999 || Socorro || LINEAR || MAR || align=right | 3.8 km || 
|-id=564 bgcolor=#fefefe
| 33564 Miriamshira ||  ||  || May 10, 1999 || Socorro || LINEAR || — || align=right | 3.1 km || 
|-id=565 bgcolor=#E9E9E9
| 33565 Samferguson ||  ||  || May 10, 1999 || Socorro || LINEAR || — || align=right | 3.5 km || 
|-id=566 bgcolor=#fefefe
| 33566 ||  || — || May 10, 1999 || Socorro || LINEAR || — || align=right | 5.7 km || 
|-id=567 bgcolor=#d6d6d6
| 33567 Sulekhfrederic ||  ||  || May 10, 1999 || Socorro || LINEAR || THM || align=right | 6.1 km || 
|-id=568 bgcolor=#E9E9E9
| 33568 Godishala ||  ||  || May 10, 1999 || Socorro || LINEAR || — || align=right | 6.4 km || 
|-id=569 bgcolor=#fefefe
| 33569 Nikhilgopal ||  ||  || May 10, 1999 || Socorro || LINEAR || FLO || align=right | 2.2 km || 
|-id=570 bgcolor=#E9E9E9
| 33570 Jagruenstein ||  ||  || May 10, 1999 || Socorro || LINEAR || MRX || align=right | 4.1 km || 
|-id=571 bgcolor=#E9E9E9
| 33571 Jaygupta ||  ||  || May 10, 1999 || Socorro || LINEAR || — || align=right | 2.4 km || 
|-id=572 bgcolor=#E9E9E9
| 33572 Mandolin ||  ||  || May 10, 1999 || Socorro || LINEAR || — || align=right | 2.3 km || 
|-id=573 bgcolor=#fefefe
| 33573 Hugrace ||  ||  || May 10, 1999 || Socorro || LINEAR || — || align=right | 5.6 km || 
|-id=574 bgcolor=#fefefe
| 33574 Shailaja ||  ||  || May 10, 1999 || Socorro || LINEAR || — || align=right | 2.4 km || 
|-id=575 bgcolor=#E9E9E9
| 33575 Joshuajacob ||  ||  || May 10, 1999 || Socorro || LINEAR || — || align=right | 7.4 km || 
|-id=576 bgcolor=#E9E9E9
| 33576 ||  || — || May 10, 1999 || Socorro || LINEAR || — || align=right | 9.9 km || 
|-id=577 bgcolor=#E9E9E9
| 33577 ||  || — || May 10, 1999 || Socorro || LINEAR || — || align=right | 6.3 km || 
|-id=578 bgcolor=#E9E9E9
| 33578 ||  || — || May 10, 1999 || Socorro || LINEAR || — || align=right | 8.3 km || 
|-id=579 bgcolor=#d6d6d6
| 33579 ||  || — || May 10, 1999 || Socorro || LINEAR || — || align=right | 7.0 km || 
|-id=580 bgcolor=#fefefe
| 33580 Priyankajain ||  ||  || May 10, 1999 || Socorro || LINEAR || NYS || align=right | 2.9 km || 
|-id=581 bgcolor=#fefefe
| 33581 Rajeevjha ||  ||  || May 10, 1999 || Socorro || LINEAR || — || align=right | 2.9 km || 
|-id=582 bgcolor=#fefefe
| 33582 Tiashajoardar ||  ||  || May 10, 1999 || Socorro || LINEAR || — || align=right | 2.0 km || 
|-id=583 bgcolor=#E9E9E9
| 33583 Karamchedu ||  ||  || May 10, 1999 || Socorro || LINEAR || — || align=right | 3.7 km || 
|-id=584 bgcolor=#fefefe
| 33584 Austinkatzer ||  ||  || May 10, 1999 || Socorro || LINEAR || V || align=right | 2.3 km || 
|-id=585 bgcolor=#d6d6d6
| 33585 ||  || — || May 10, 1999 || Socorro || LINEAR || — || align=right | 11 km || 
|-id=586 bgcolor=#E9E9E9
| 33586 Keeley ||  ||  || May 10, 1999 || Socorro || LINEAR || — || align=right | 6.4 km || 
|-id=587 bgcolor=#fefefe
| 33587 Arianakim ||  ||  || May 10, 1999 || Socorro || LINEAR || NYS || align=right | 5.5 km || 
|-id=588 bgcolor=#E9E9E9
| 33588 ||  || — || May 10, 1999 || Socorro || LINEAR || — || align=right | 5.7 km || 
|-id=589 bgcolor=#d6d6d6
| 33589 Edwardkim ||  ||  || May 10, 1999 || Socorro || LINEAR || — || align=right | 6.4 km || 
|-id=590 bgcolor=#fefefe
| 33590 Sreelakshmi ||  ||  || May 10, 1999 || Socorro || LINEAR || V || align=right | 2.2 km || 
|-id=591 bgcolor=#fefefe
| 33591 Landsberger ||  ||  || May 10, 1999 || Socorro || LINEAR || — || align=right | 3.2 km || 
|-id=592 bgcolor=#fefefe
| 33592 Kathrynanna ||  ||  || May 10, 1999 || Socorro || LINEAR || — || align=right | 6.8 km || 
|-id=593 bgcolor=#d6d6d6
| 33593 ||  || — || May 10, 1999 || Socorro || LINEAR || — || align=right | 9.2 km || 
|-id=594 bgcolor=#fefefe
| 33594 Ralphlawton ||  ||  || May 10, 1999 || Socorro || LINEAR || — || align=right | 2.5 km || 
|-id=595 bgcolor=#fefefe
| 33595 Jiwoolee ||  ||  || May 10, 1999 || Socorro || LINEAR || — || align=right | 4.0 km || 
|-id=596 bgcolor=#E9E9E9
| 33596 Taesoolee ||  ||  || May 10, 1999 || Socorro || LINEAR || — || align=right | 7.2 km || 
|-id=597 bgcolor=#fefefe
| 33597 ||  || — || May 10, 1999 || Socorro || LINEAR || MAS || align=right | 2.2 km || 
|-id=598 bgcolor=#E9E9E9
| 33598 Christineliu ||  ||  || May 10, 1999 || Socorro || LINEAR || — || align=right | 3.8 km || 
|-id=599 bgcolor=#fefefe
| 33599 Mckennaloop ||  ||  || May 10, 1999 || Socorro || LINEAR || FLO || align=right | 2.9 km || 
|-id=600 bgcolor=#fefefe
| 33600 Davidlu ||  ||  || May 10, 1999 || Socorro || LINEAR || V || align=right | 2.2 km || 
|}

33601–33700 

|-bgcolor=#d6d6d6
| 33601 ||  || — || May 10, 1999 || Socorro || LINEAR || — || align=right | 6.8 km || 
|-id=602 bgcolor=#fefefe
| 33602 Varunmandi ||  ||  || May 10, 1999 || Socorro || LINEAR || — || align=right | 4.1 km || 
|-id=603 bgcolor=#E9E9E9
| 33603 Saramason ||  ||  || May 10, 1999 || Socorro || LINEAR || — || align=right | 3.4 km || 
|-id=604 bgcolor=#d6d6d6
| 33604 McChesney ||  ||  || May 10, 1999 || Socorro || LINEAR || — || align=right | 5.8 km || 
|-id=605 bgcolor=#fefefe
| 33605 McCue ||  ||  || May 10, 1999 || Socorro || LINEAR || — || align=right | 2.3 km || 
|-id=606 bgcolor=#E9E9E9
| 33606 Brandonmuncan ||  ||  || May 10, 1999 || Socorro || LINEAR || — || align=right | 7.0 km || 
|-id=607 bgcolor=#E9E9E9
| 33607 Archanamurali ||  ||  || May 10, 1999 || Socorro || LINEAR || — || align=right | 7.2 km || 
|-id=608 bgcolor=#fefefe
| 33608 Paladugu ||  ||  || May 10, 1999 || Socorro || LINEAR || — || align=right | 4.0 km || 
|-id=609 bgcolor=#d6d6d6
| 33609 Harishpalani ||  ||  || May 10, 1999 || Socorro || LINEAR || — || align=right | 6.7 km || 
|-id=610 bgcolor=#fefefe
| 33610 Payra ||  ||  || May 10, 1999 || Socorro || LINEAR || — || align=right | 2.7 km || 
|-id=611 bgcolor=#E9E9E9
| 33611 ||  || — || May 10, 1999 || Socorro || LINEAR || — || align=right | 3.6 km || 
|-id=612 bgcolor=#E9E9E9
| 33612 ||  || — || May 10, 1999 || Socorro || LINEAR || — || align=right | 7.2 km || 
|-id=613 bgcolor=#fefefe
| 33613 Pendharkar ||  ||  || May 10, 1999 || Socorro || LINEAR || — || align=right | 4.8 km || 
|-id=614 bgcolor=#E9E9E9
| 33614 Meganploch ||  ||  || May 10, 1999 || Socorro || LINEAR || NEM || align=right | 7.8 km || 
|-id=615 bgcolor=#fefefe
| 33615 ||  || — || May 10, 1999 || Socorro || LINEAR || — || align=right | 5.3 km || 
|-id=616 bgcolor=#fefefe
| 33616 ||  || — || May 10, 1999 || Socorro || LINEAR || — || align=right | 6.1 km || 
|-id=617 bgcolor=#fefefe
| 33617 Kailashraman ||  ||  || May 12, 1999 || Socorro || LINEAR || FLO || align=right | 2.9 km || 
|-id=618 bgcolor=#fefefe
| 33618 ||  || — || May 12, 1999 || Socorro || LINEAR || NYS || align=right | 1.9 km || 
|-id=619 bgcolor=#E9E9E9
| 33619 Dominickrowan ||  ||  || May 12, 1999 || Socorro || LINEAR || — || align=right | 6.8 km || 
|-id=620 bgcolor=#d6d6d6
| 33620 ||  || — || May 12, 1999 || Socorro || LINEAR || EOS || align=right | 5.5 km || 
|-id=621 bgcolor=#fefefe
| 33621 Sathish ||  ||  || May 12, 1999 || Socorro || LINEAR || — || align=right | 2.6 km || 
|-id=622 bgcolor=#E9E9E9
| 33622 Sedigh ||  ||  || May 12, 1999 || Socorro || LINEAR || — || align=right | 5.2 km || 
|-id=623 bgcolor=#fefefe
| 33623 Kyraseevers ||  ||  || May 12, 1999 || Socorro || LINEAR || NYS || align=right | 2.0 km || 
|-id=624 bgcolor=#fefefe
| 33624 Omersiddiqui ||  ||  || May 12, 1999 || Socorro || LINEAR || — || align=right | 3.4 km || 
|-id=625 bgcolor=#fefefe
| 33625 Slepyan ||  ||  || May 12, 1999 || Socorro || LINEAR || — || align=right | 2.1 km || 
|-id=626 bgcolor=#E9E9E9
| 33626 Jasonsmith ||  ||  || May 12, 1999 || Socorro || LINEAR || — || align=right | 2.5 km || 
|-id=627 bgcolor=#d6d6d6
| 33627 ||  || — || May 12, 1999 || Socorro || LINEAR || — || align=right | 9.0 km || 
|-id=628 bgcolor=#fefefe
| 33628 Spettel ||  ||  || May 12, 1999 || Socorro || LINEAR || — || align=right | 2.9 km || 
|-id=629 bgcolor=#d6d6d6
| 33629 ||  || — || May 10, 1999 || Socorro || LINEAR || — || align=right | 4.6 km || 
|-id=630 bgcolor=#fefefe
| 33630 Swathiravi ||  ||  || May 10, 1999 || Socorro || LINEAR || V || align=right | 2.9 km || 
|-id=631 bgcolor=#E9E9E9
| 33631 ||  || — || May 12, 1999 || Socorro || LINEAR || GEF || align=right | 3.9 km || 
|-id=632 bgcolor=#fefefe
| 33632 ||  || — || May 13, 1999 || Socorro || LINEAR || — || align=right | 3.5 km || 
|-id=633 bgcolor=#E9E9E9
| 33633 Strickland ||  ||  || May 13, 1999 || Socorro || LINEAR || DOR || align=right | 7.4 km || 
|-id=634 bgcolor=#fefefe
| 33634 Strickler ||  ||  || May 13, 1999 || Socorro || LINEAR || — || align=right | 5.4 km || 
|-id=635 bgcolor=#E9E9E9
| 33635 ||  || — || May 12, 1999 || Socorro || LINEAR || — || align=right | 4.5 km || 
|-id=636 bgcolor=#E9E9E9
| 33636 ||  || — || May 12, 1999 || Socorro || LINEAR || — || align=right | 4.7 km || 
|-id=637 bgcolor=#E9E9E9
| 33637 ||  || — || May 12, 1999 || Socorro || LINEAR || EUN || align=right | 4.2 km || 
|-id=638 bgcolor=#E9E9E9
| 33638 ||  || — || May 12, 1999 || Socorro || LINEAR || MAR || align=right | 4.0 km || 
|-id=639 bgcolor=#d6d6d6
| 33639 ||  || — || May 12, 1999 || Socorro || LINEAR || — || align=right | 7.0 km || 
|-id=640 bgcolor=#E9E9E9
| 33640 ||  || — || May 12, 1999 || Socorro || LINEAR || ADE || align=right | 9.0 km || 
|-id=641 bgcolor=#E9E9E9
| 33641 ||  || — || May 12, 1999 || Socorro || LINEAR || EUN || align=right | 5.7 km || 
|-id=642 bgcolor=#fefefe
| 33642 ||  || — || May 12, 1999 || Socorro || LINEAR || — || align=right | 4.9 km || 
|-id=643 bgcolor=#E9E9E9
| 33643 ||  || — || May 12, 1999 || Socorro || LINEAR || EUN || align=right | 5.2 km || 
|-id=644 bgcolor=#E9E9E9
| 33644 ||  || — || May 12, 1999 || Socorro || LINEAR || MAR || align=right | 4.9 km || 
|-id=645 bgcolor=#E9E9E9
| 33645 ||  || — || May 12, 1999 || Socorro || LINEAR || — || align=right | 9.8 km || 
|-id=646 bgcolor=#E9E9E9
| 33646 ||  || — || May 12, 1999 || Socorro || LINEAR || — || align=right | 5.2 km || 
|-id=647 bgcolor=#E9E9E9
| 33647 ||  || — || May 12, 1999 || Socorro || LINEAR || EUN || align=right | 3.3 km || 
|-id=648 bgcolor=#E9E9E9
| 33648 ||  || — || May 12, 1999 || Socorro || LINEAR || MAR || align=right | 4.0 km || 
|-id=649 bgcolor=#E9E9E9
| 33649 ||  || — || May 12, 1999 || Socorro || LINEAR || — || align=right | 4.2 km || 
|-id=650 bgcolor=#E9E9E9
| 33650 ||  || — || May 12, 1999 || Socorro || LINEAR || — || align=right | 4.3 km || 
|-id=651 bgcolor=#E9E9E9
| 33651 ||  || — || May 12, 1999 || Socorro || LINEAR || MAR || align=right | 5.3 km || 
|-id=652 bgcolor=#E9E9E9
| 33652 ||  || — || May 12, 1999 || Socorro || LINEAR || — || align=right | 4.5 km || 
|-id=653 bgcolor=#E9E9E9
| 33653 ||  || — || May 12, 1999 || Socorro || LINEAR || EUN || align=right | 5.0 km || 
|-id=654 bgcolor=#E9E9E9
| 33654 ||  || — || May 12, 1999 || Socorro || LINEAR || EUN || align=right | 3.9 km || 
|-id=655 bgcolor=#fefefe
| 33655 Sumathipala ||  ||  || May 12, 1999 || Socorro || LINEAR || — || align=right | 2.8 km || 
|-id=656 bgcolor=#E9E9E9
| 33656 ||  || — || May 12, 1999 || Socorro || LINEAR || EUN || align=right | 3.4 km || 
|-id=657 bgcolor=#E9E9E9
| 33657 ||  || — || May 12, 1999 || Socorro || LINEAR || — || align=right | 3.7 km || 
|-id=658 bgcolor=#E9E9E9
| 33658 ||  || — || May 12, 1999 || Socorro || LINEAR || — || align=right | 2.4 km || 
|-id=659 bgcolor=#E9E9E9
| 33659 ||  || — || May 12, 1999 || Socorro || LINEAR || GER || align=right | 6.0 km || 
|-id=660 bgcolor=#fefefe
| 33660 Rishishankar ||  ||  || May 12, 1999 || Socorro || LINEAR || — || align=right | 2.2 km || 
|-id=661 bgcolor=#fefefe
| 33661 Sophiaswartz ||  ||  || May 12, 1999 || Socorro || LINEAR || V || align=right | 2.2 km || 
|-id=662 bgcolor=#fefefe
| 33662 Tacescu ||  ||  || May 12, 1999 || Socorro || LINEAR || V || align=right | 2.9 km || 
|-id=663 bgcolor=#E9E9E9
| 33663 ||  || — || May 12, 1999 || Socorro || LINEAR || — || align=right | 6.2 km || 
|-id=664 bgcolor=#E9E9E9
| 33664 ||  || — || May 12, 1999 || Socorro || LINEAR || — || align=right | 4.8 km || 
|-id=665 bgcolor=#d6d6d6
| 33665 ||  || — || May 12, 1999 || Socorro || LINEAR || EOS || align=right | 6.2 km || 
|-id=666 bgcolor=#d6d6d6
| 33666 ||  || — || May 12, 1999 || Socorro || LINEAR || URS || align=right | 8.5 km || 
|-id=667 bgcolor=#d6d6d6
| 33667 Uttripathii ||  ||  || May 12, 1999 || Socorro || LINEAR || — || align=right | 8.7 km || 
|-id=668 bgcolor=#E9E9E9
| 33668 ||  || — || May 12, 1999 || Socorro || LINEAR || ADE || align=right | 11 km || 
|-id=669 bgcolor=#d6d6d6
| 33669 ||  || — || May 12, 1999 || Socorro || LINEAR || — || align=right | 9.5 km || 
|-id=670 bgcolor=#fefefe
| 33670 ||  || — || May 12, 1999 || Socorro || LINEAR || — || align=right | 3.1 km || 
|-id=671 bgcolor=#E9E9E9
| 33671 ||  || — || May 12, 1999 || Socorro || LINEAR || GEF || align=right | 5.8 km || 
|-id=672 bgcolor=#E9E9E9
| 33672 ||  || — || May 12, 1999 || Socorro || LINEAR || MAR || align=right | 5.1 km || 
|-id=673 bgcolor=#E9E9E9
| 33673 ||  || — || May 12, 1999 || Socorro || LINEAR || — || align=right | 5.7 km || 
|-id=674 bgcolor=#E9E9E9
| 33674 ||  || — || May 12, 1999 || Socorro || LINEAR || — || align=right | 7.8 km || 
|-id=675 bgcolor=#E9E9E9
| 33675 ||  || — || May 12, 1999 || Socorro || LINEAR || — || align=right | 9.4 km || 
|-id=676 bgcolor=#E9E9E9
| 33676 ||  || — || May 13, 1999 || Socorro || LINEAR || — || align=right | 10 km || 
|-id=677 bgcolor=#fefefe
| 33677 Truell ||  ||  || May 13, 1999 || Socorro || LINEAR || V || align=right | 1.9 km || 
|-id=678 bgcolor=#E9E9E9
| 33678 ||  || — || May 13, 1999 || Socorro || LINEAR || — || align=right | 2.5 km || 
|-id=679 bgcolor=#E9E9E9
| 33679 ||  || — || May 13, 1999 || Socorro || LINEAR || — || align=right | 5.2 km || 
|-id=680 bgcolor=#E9E9E9
| 33680 Vasconcelos ||  ||  || May 13, 1999 || Socorro || LINEAR || — || align=right | 3.1 km || 
|-id=681 bgcolor=#fefefe
| 33681 Wamsley ||  ||  || May 13, 1999 || Socorro || LINEAR || MAS || align=right | 1.9 km || 
|-id=682 bgcolor=#E9E9E9
| 33682 Waylonreid ||  ||  || May 13, 1999 || Socorro || LINEAR || — || align=right | 2.5 km || 
|-id=683 bgcolor=#fefefe
| 33683 ||  || — || May 13, 1999 || Socorro || LINEAR || — || align=right | 2.0 km || 
|-id=684 bgcolor=#fefefe
| 33684 Xiaomichael ||  ||  || May 13, 1999 || Socorro || LINEAR || V || align=right | 3.6 km || 
|-id=685 bgcolor=#E9E9E9
| 33685 Younglove ||  ||  || May 13, 1999 || Socorro || LINEAR || — || align=right | 3.6 km || 
|-id=686 bgcolor=#d6d6d6
| 33686 ||  || — || May 13, 1999 || Socorro || LINEAR || EOS || align=right | 5.1 km || 
|-id=687 bgcolor=#E9E9E9
| 33687 Julianbain ||  ||  || May 13, 1999 || Socorro || LINEAR || RAF || align=right | 2.8 km || 
|-id=688 bgcolor=#d6d6d6
| 33688 Meghnabehari ||  ||  || May 13, 1999 || Socorro || LINEAR || — || align=right | 6.8 km || 
|-id=689 bgcolor=#d6d6d6
| 33689 ||  || — || May 13, 1999 || Socorro || LINEAR || EOS || align=right | 8.1 km || 
|-id=690 bgcolor=#d6d6d6
| 33690 Noahcain ||  ||  || May 13, 1999 || Socorro || LINEAR || HYG || align=right | 6.8 km || 
|-id=691 bgcolor=#d6d6d6
| 33691 Andrewchiang ||  ||  || May 13, 1999 || Socorro || LINEAR || EOS || align=right | 4.8 km || 
|-id=692 bgcolor=#E9E9E9
| 33692 ||  || — || May 14, 1999 || Catalina || CSS || EUN || align=right | 3.2 km || 
|-id=693 bgcolor=#E9E9E9
| 33693 || 1999 KA || — || May 16, 1999 || Prescott || P. G. Comba || — || align=right | 6.5 km || 
|-id=694 bgcolor=#fefefe
| 33694 || 1999 KN || — || May 16, 1999 || Catalina || CSS || — || align=right | 2.9 km || 
|-id=695 bgcolor=#d6d6d6
| 33695 ||  || — || May 17, 1999 || Kitt Peak || Spacewatch || THM || align=right | 5.9 km || 
|-id=696 bgcolor=#fefefe
| 33696 Crouchley ||  ||  || May 18, 1999 || Socorro || LINEAR || NYS || align=right | 1.8 km || 
|-id=697 bgcolor=#fefefe
| 33697 ||  || — || May 18, 1999 || Socorro || LINEAR || V || align=right | 4.5 km || 
|-id=698 bgcolor=#E9E9E9
| 33698 ||  || — || May 18, 1999 || Socorro || LINEAR || — || align=right | 8.5 km || 
|-id=699 bgcolor=#E9E9E9
| 33699 Jessiegan ||  ||  || May 18, 1999 || Socorro || LINEAR || ASTslow || align=right | 8.6 km || 
|-id=700 bgcolor=#fefefe
| 33700 Gluckman ||  ||  || May 18, 1999 || Socorro || LINEAR || NYS || align=right | 4.4 km || 
|}

33701–33800 

|-bgcolor=#fefefe
| 33701 Gotthold ||  ||  || May 18, 1999 || Socorro || LINEAR || FLO || align=right | 2.3 km || 
|-id=702 bgcolor=#fefefe
| 33702 Spencergreen ||  ||  || May 18, 1999 || Socorro || LINEAR || — || align=right | 2.6 km || 
|-id=703 bgcolor=#E9E9E9
| 33703 Anthonyhill ||  ||  || May 18, 1999 || Socorro || LINEAR || — || align=right | 4.7 km || 
|-id=704 bgcolor=#fefefe
| 33704 Herinkang ||  ||  || May 18, 1999 || Socorro || LINEAR || — || align=right | 4.6 km || 
|-id=705 bgcolor=#fefefe
| 33705 || 1999 LJ || — || June 5, 1999 || Višnjan Observatory || K. Korlević || — || align=right | 4.3 km || 
|-id=706 bgcolor=#E9E9E9
| 33706 ||  || — || June 10, 1999 || Socorro || LINEAR || MAR || align=right | 3.6 km || 
|-id=707 bgcolor=#E9E9E9
| 33707 ||  || — || June 8, 1999 || Socorro || LINEAR || — || align=right | 7.7 km || 
|-id=708 bgcolor=#E9E9E9
| 33708 ||  || — || June 8, 1999 || Socorro || LINEAR || EUN || align=right | 5.5 km || 
|-id=709 bgcolor=#E9E9E9
| 33709 ||  || — || June 8, 1999 || Socorro || LINEAR || EUN || align=right | 5.2 km || 
|-id=710 bgcolor=#E9E9E9
| 33710 ||  || — || June 9, 1999 || Socorro || LINEAR || MAR || align=right | 4.5 km || 
|-id=711 bgcolor=#E9E9E9
| 33711 ||  || — || June 12, 1999 || Socorro || LINEAR || MAR || align=right | 2.8 km || 
|-id=712 bgcolor=#d6d6d6
| 33712 ||  || — || June 10, 1999 || Woomera || F. B. Zoltowski || EOS || align=right | 5.5 km || 
|-id=713 bgcolor=#fefefe
| 33713 Mithravamshi ||  ||  || June 9, 1999 || Socorro || LINEAR || — || align=right | 4.0 km || 
|-id=714 bgcolor=#fefefe
| 33714 Sarakaufman ||  ||  || June 9, 1999 || Socorro || LINEAR || — || align=right | 3.8 km || 
|-id=715 bgcolor=#d6d6d6
| 33715 ||  || — || June 9, 1999 || Socorro || LINEAR || — || align=right | 6.9 km || 
|-id=716 bgcolor=#E9E9E9
| 33716 ||  || — || June 9, 1999 || Socorro || LINEAR || — || align=right | 4.6 km || 
|-id=717 bgcolor=#E9E9E9
| 33717 ||  || — || June 9, 1999 || Socorro || LINEAR || — || align=right | 8.7 km || 
|-id=718 bgcolor=#E9E9E9
| 33718 ||  || — || June 9, 1999 || Socorro || LINEAR || EUN || align=right | 5.9 km || 
|-id=719 bgcolor=#E9E9E9
| 33719 ||  || — || June 9, 1999 || Socorro || LINEAR || — || align=right | 7.0 km || 
|-id=720 bgcolor=#E9E9E9
| 33720 ||  || — || June 9, 1999 || Socorro || LINEAR || — || align=right | 4.8 km || 
|-id=721 bgcolor=#E9E9E9
| 33721 ||  || — || June 12, 1999 || Catalina || CSS || — || align=right | 7.5 km || 
|-id=722 bgcolor=#d6d6d6
| 33722 || 1999 NO || — || July 7, 1999 || Reedy Creek || J. Broughton || KOR || align=right | 4.6 km || 
|-id=723 bgcolor=#fefefe
| 33723 ||  || — || July 13, 1999 || Socorro || LINEAR || — || align=right | 4.6 km || 
|-id=724 bgcolor=#d6d6d6
| 33724 ||  || — || July 12, 1999 || Višnjan Observatory || K. Korlević || ALA || align=right | 13 km || 
|-id=725 bgcolor=#d6d6d6
| 33725 Robertkent ||  ||  || July 13, 1999 || Socorro || LINEAR || — || align=right | 5.2 km || 
|-id=726 bgcolor=#E9E9E9
| 33726 ||  || — || July 13, 1999 || Socorro || LINEAR || — || align=right | 9.1 km || 
|-id=727 bgcolor=#E9E9E9
| 33727 Kummel ||  ||  || July 14, 1999 || Socorro || LINEAR || GEF || align=right | 4.5 km || 
|-id=728 bgcolor=#d6d6d6
| 33728 ||  || — || July 14, 1999 || Socorro || LINEAR || — || align=right | 10 km || 
|-id=729 bgcolor=#E9E9E9
| 33729 ||  || — || July 14, 1999 || Socorro || LINEAR || ADE || align=right | 12 km || 
|-id=730 bgcolor=#d6d6d6
| 33730 ||  || — || July 14, 1999 || Socorro || LINEAR || EOS || align=right | 5.7 km || 
|-id=731 bgcolor=#d6d6d6
| 33731 ||  || — || July 14, 1999 || Socorro || LINEAR || TEL || align=right | 5.1 km || 
|-id=732 bgcolor=#d6d6d6
| 33732 ||  || — || July 14, 1999 || Socorro || LINEAR || EOS || align=right | 9.6 km || 
|-id=733 bgcolor=#d6d6d6
| 33733 ||  || — || July 14, 1999 || Socorro || LINEAR || — || align=right | 11 km || 
|-id=734 bgcolor=#d6d6d6
| 33734 Stephenlitt ||  ||  || July 14, 1999 || Socorro || LINEAR || HYG || align=right | 8.8 km || 
|-id=735 bgcolor=#E9E9E9
| 33735 ||  || — || July 14, 1999 || Socorro || LINEAR || EUN || align=right | 5.9 km || 
|-id=736 bgcolor=#E9E9E9
| 33736 ||  || — || July 14, 1999 || Socorro || LINEAR || slow || align=right | 7.0 km || 
|-id=737 bgcolor=#E9E9E9
| 33737 Helenlyons ||  ||  || July 14, 1999 || Socorro || LINEAR || — || align=right | 7.1 km || 
|-id=738 bgcolor=#d6d6d6
| 33738 ||  || — || July 14, 1999 || Socorro || LINEAR || — || align=right | 13 km || 
|-id=739 bgcolor=#d6d6d6
| 33739 ||  || — || July 13, 1999 || Socorro || LINEAR || EOS || align=right | 5.9 km || 
|-id=740 bgcolor=#fefefe
| 33740 Arjunmoorthy ||  ||  || July 13, 1999 || Socorro || LINEAR || — || align=right | 3.6 km || 
|-id=741 bgcolor=#E9E9E9
| 33741 ||  || — || July 13, 1999 || Socorro || LINEAR || — || align=right | 7.3 km || 
|-id=742 bgcolor=#E9E9E9
| 33742 ||  || — || July 13, 1999 || Socorro || LINEAR || — || align=right | 4.4 km || 
|-id=743 bgcolor=#d6d6d6
| 33743 ||  || — || July 12, 1999 || Socorro || LINEAR || — || align=right | 22 km || 
|-id=744 bgcolor=#d6d6d6
| 33744 ||  || — || July 12, 1999 || Socorro || LINEAR || — || align=right | 11 km || 
|-id=745 bgcolor=#E9E9E9
| 33745 ||  || — || July 13, 1999 || Socorro || LINEAR || — || align=right | 4.6 km || 
|-id=746 bgcolor=#d6d6d6
| 33746 Sombart || 1999 OK ||  || July 17, 1999 || Pises || Pises Obs. || URS || align=right | 8.4 km || 
|-id=747 bgcolor=#d6d6d6
| 33747 Clingan ||  ||  || August 14, 1999 || Farpoint || G. Hug || — || align=right | 5.8 km || 
|-id=748 bgcolor=#d6d6d6
| 33748 Davegault ||  ||  || August 15, 1999 || Reedy Creek || J. Broughton || — || align=right | 16 km || 
|-id=749 bgcolor=#d6d6d6
| 33749 || 1999 QO || — || August 19, 1999 || Ondřejov || P. Pravec || TEL || align=right | 5.3 km || 
|-id=750 bgcolor=#E9E9E9
| 33750 Davehiggins ||  ||  || September 6, 1999 || Fountain Hills || C. W. Juels || PAL || align=right | 12 km || 
|-id=751 bgcolor=#d6d6d6
| 33751 ||  || — || September 7, 1999 || Socorro || LINEAR || THM || align=right | 8.8 km || 
|-id=752 bgcolor=#E9E9E9
| 33752 ||  || — || September 12, 1999 || Črni Vrh || Črni Vrh || GER || align=right | 6.2 km || 
|-id=753 bgcolor=#d6d6d6
| 33753 ||  || — || September 13, 1999 || Črni Vrh || Črni Vrh || 3:2 || align=right | 16 km || 
|-id=754 bgcolor=#d6d6d6
| 33754 ||  || — || September 7, 1999 || Socorro || LINEAR || — || align=right | 5.9 km || 
|-id=755 bgcolor=#d6d6d6
| 33755 ||  || — || September 7, 1999 || Socorro || LINEAR || — || align=right | 10 km || 
|-id=756 bgcolor=#d6d6d6
| 33756 ||  || — || September 7, 1999 || Socorro || LINEAR || — || align=right | 7.0 km || 
|-id=757 bgcolor=#d6d6d6
| 33757 ||  || — || September 7, 1999 || Socorro || LINEAR || THM || align=right | 9.5 km || 
|-id=758 bgcolor=#d6d6d6
| 33758 ||  || — || September 7, 1999 || Socorro || LINEAR || EOS || align=right | 5.8 km || 
|-id=759 bgcolor=#d6d6d6
| 33759 ||  || — || September 7, 1999 || Socorro || LINEAR || — || align=right | 12 km || 
|-id=760 bgcolor=#d6d6d6
| 33760 ||  || — || September 7, 1999 || Socorro || LINEAR || — || align=right | 9.5 km || 
|-id=761 bgcolor=#fefefe
| 33761 Honoranavid ||  ||  || September 7, 1999 || Socorro || LINEAR || — || align=right | 3.3 km || 
|-id=762 bgcolor=#E9E9E9
| 33762 Sanjayseshan ||  ||  || September 7, 1999 || Socorro || LINEAR || HEN || align=right | 4.5 km || 
|-id=763 bgcolor=#d6d6d6
| 33763 ||  || — || September 7, 1999 || Socorro || LINEAR || 629 || align=right | 5.9 km || 
|-id=764 bgcolor=#d6d6d6
| 33764 ||  || — || September 7, 1999 || Socorro || LINEAR || THM || align=right | 12 km || 
|-id=765 bgcolor=#E9E9E9
| 33765 ||  || — || September 8, 1999 || Socorro || LINEAR || — || align=right | 4.3 km || 
|-id=766 bgcolor=#d6d6d6
| 33766 ||  || — || September 8, 1999 || Socorro || LINEAR || — || align=right | 14 km || 
|-id=767 bgcolor=#E9E9E9
| 33767 ||  || — || September 8, 1999 || Socorro || LINEAR || — || align=right | 7.4 km || 
|-id=768 bgcolor=#E9E9E9
| 33768 ||  || — || September 8, 1999 || Socorro || LINEAR || — || align=right | 10 km || 
|-id=769 bgcolor=#E9E9E9
| 33769 ||  || — || September 9, 1999 || Socorro || LINEAR || — || align=right | 10 km || 
|-id=770 bgcolor=#d6d6d6
| 33770 ||  || — || September 9, 1999 || Socorro || LINEAR || — || align=right | 10 km || 
|-id=771 bgcolor=#d6d6d6
| 33771 ||  || — || September 9, 1999 || Socorro || LINEAR || — || align=right | 11 km || 
|-id=772 bgcolor=#d6d6d6
| 33772 ||  || — || September 9, 1999 || Socorro || LINEAR || — || align=right | 10 km || 
|-id=773 bgcolor=#E9E9E9
| 33773 ||  || — || September 9, 1999 || Socorro || LINEAR || MIT || align=right | 7.1 km || 
|-id=774 bgcolor=#d6d6d6
| 33774 ||  || — || September 9, 1999 || Socorro || LINEAR || — || align=right | 5.0 km || 
|-id=775 bgcolor=#d6d6d6
| 33775 ||  || — || September 9, 1999 || Socorro || LINEAR || — || align=right | 10 km || 
|-id=776 bgcolor=#d6d6d6
| 33776 ||  || — || September 9, 1999 || Socorro || LINEAR || URS || align=right | 18 km || 
|-id=777 bgcolor=#d6d6d6
| 33777 ||  || — || September 9, 1999 || Socorro || LINEAR || THM || align=right | 12 km || 
|-id=778 bgcolor=#d6d6d6
| 33778 ||  || — || September 9, 1999 || Socorro || LINEAR || EOS || align=right | 7.7 km || 
|-id=779 bgcolor=#d6d6d6
| 33779 ||  || — || September 9, 1999 || Socorro || LINEAR || — || align=right | 10 km || 
|-id=780 bgcolor=#d6d6d6
| 33780 ||  || — || September 9, 1999 || Socorro || LINEAR || EOS || align=right | 7.3 km || 
|-id=781 bgcolor=#d6d6d6
| 33781 ||  || — || September 9, 1999 || Socorro || LINEAR || THM || align=right | 11 km || 
|-id=782 bgcolor=#d6d6d6
| 33782 ||  || — || September 9, 1999 || Socorro || LINEAR || 7:4 || align=right | 6.7 km || 
|-id=783 bgcolor=#d6d6d6
| 33783 ||  || — || September 9, 1999 || Socorro || LINEAR || THM || align=right | 10 km || 
|-id=784 bgcolor=#d6d6d6
| 33784 ||  || — || September 9, 1999 || Socorro || LINEAR || — || align=right | 8.5 km || 
|-id=785 bgcolor=#E9E9E9
| 33785 ||  || — || September 13, 1999 || Socorro || LINEAR || — || align=right | 5.0 km || 
|-id=786 bgcolor=#d6d6d6
| 33786 ||  || — || September 8, 1999 || Socorro || LINEAR || — || align=right | 7.6 km || 
|-id=787 bgcolor=#d6d6d6
| 33787 ||  || — || September 7, 1999 || Kitt Peak || Spacewatch || — || align=right | 4.9 km || 
|-id=788 bgcolor=#d6d6d6
| 33788 ||  || — || September 11, 1999 || Anderson Mesa || LONEOS || — || align=right | 8.8 km || 
|-id=789 bgcolor=#E9E9E9
| 33789 Sharmacam ||  ||  || September 29, 1999 || Socorro || LINEAR || — || align=right | 3.6 km || 
|-id=790 bgcolor=#E9E9E9
| 33790 ||  || — || September 29, 1999 || Socorro || LINEAR || ADE || align=right | 6.5 km || 
|-id=791 bgcolor=#fefefe
| 33791 ||  || — || September 30, 1999 || Socorro || LINEAR || FLO || align=right | 3.4 km || 
|-id=792 bgcolor=#d6d6d6
| 33792 ||  || — || September 30, 1999 || Socorro || LINEAR || TIR || align=right | 7.6 km || 
|-id=793 bgcolor=#d6d6d6
| 33793 ||  || — || September 30, 1999 || Socorro || LINEAR || — || align=right | 13 km || 
|-id=794 bgcolor=#d6d6d6
| 33794 ||  || — || October 2, 1999 || Fountain Hills || C. W. Juels || ALA || align=right | 20 km || 
|-id=795 bgcolor=#d6d6d6
| 33795 ||  || — || October 6, 1999 || Višnjan Observatory || K. Korlević, M. Jurić || — || align=right | 12 km || 
|-id=796 bgcolor=#d6d6d6
| 33796 ||  || — || October 1, 1999 || Catalina || CSS || — || align=right | 14 km || 
|-id=797 bgcolor=#d6d6d6
| 33797 ||  || — || October 2, 1999 || Socorro || LINEAR || THM || align=right | 9.0 km || 
|-id=798 bgcolor=#d6d6d6
| 33798 ||  || — || October 2, 1999 || Socorro || LINEAR || EOS || align=right | 5.5 km || 
|-id=799 bgcolor=#E9E9E9
| 33799 Myra ||  ||  || October 19, 1999 || Fountain Hills || C. W. Juels || — || align=right | 3.9 km || 
|-id=800 bgcolor=#d6d6d6
| 33800 Gross ||  ||  || November 8, 1999 || Fountain Hills || C. W. Juels || ALA || align=right | 23 km || 
|}

33801–33900 

|-bgcolor=#fefefe
| 33801 Emilyshi ||  ||  || November 3, 1999 || Socorro || LINEAR || — || align=right | 3.5 km || 
|-id=802 bgcolor=#d6d6d6
| 33802 ||  || — || November 8, 1999 || Catalina || CSS || EOS || align=right | 13 km || 
|-id=803 bgcolor=#fefefe
| 33803 ||  || — || November 12, 1999 || Anderson Mesa || LONEOS || — || align=right | 2.0 km || 
|-id=804 bgcolor=#fefefe
| 33804 ||  || — || November 28, 1999 || Oizumi || T. Kobayashi || NYS || align=right | 5.4 km || 
|-id=805 bgcolor=#fefefe
| 33805 ||  || — || December 7, 1999 || Fountain Hills || C. W. Juels || V || align=right | 3.2 km || 
|-id=806 bgcolor=#fefefe
| 33806 Shrivastava ||  ||  || December 6, 1999 || Socorro || LINEAR || — || align=right | 2.7 km || 
|-id=807 bgcolor=#fefefe
| 33807 ||  || — || December 7, 1999 || Socorro || LINEAR || — || align=right | 3.4 km || 
|-id=808 bgcolor=#E9E9E9
| 33808 ||  || — || December 11, 1999 || Socorro || LINEAR || — || align=right | 9.3 km || 
|-id=809 bgcolor=#fefefe
| 33809 ||  || — || December 13, 1999 || Anderson Mesa || LONEOS || — || align=right | 3.3 km || 
|-id=810 bgcolor=#fefefe
| 33810 Tangirala ||  ||  || December 8, 1999 || Socorro || LINEAR || — || align=right | 3.8 km || 
|-id=811 bgcolor=#fefefe
| 33811 Scottobin ||  ||  || December 8, 1999 || Socorro || LINEAR || — || align=right | 3.4 km || 
|-id=812 bgcolor=#E9E9E9
| 33812 ||  || — || December 10, 1999 || Socorro || LINEAR || — || align=right | 12 km || 
|-id=813 bgcolor=#E9E9E9
| 33813 ||  || — || December 10, 1999 || Socorro || LINEAR || — || align=right | 5.0 km || 
|-id=814 bgcolor=#E9E9E9
| 33814 Viswesh ||  ||  || January 3, 2000 || Socorro || LINEAR || — || align=right | 2.4 km || 
|-id=815 bgcolor=#E9E9E9
| 33815 ||  || — || January 3, 2000 || Socorro || LINEAR || — || align=right | 8.6 km || 
|-id=816 bgcolor=#fefefe
| 33816 ||  || — || January 3, 2000 || Socorro || LINEAR || Hslow? || align=right | 1.9 km || 
|-id=817 bgcolor=#fefefe
| 33817 Fariswald ||  ||  || January 4, 2000 || Socorro || LINEAR || — || align=right | 2.7 km || 
|-id=818 bgcolor=#d6d6d6
| 33818 ||  || — || January 4, 2000 || Socorro || LINEAR || URS || align=right | 15 km || 
|-id=819 bgcolor=#fefefe
| 33819 ||  || — || January 5, 2000 || Socorro || LINEAR || — || align=right | 4.8 km || 
|-id=820 bgcolor=#E9E9E9
| 33820 ||  || — || January 5, 2000 || Socorro || LINEAR || — || align=right | 7.1 km || 
|-id=821 bgcolor=#d6d6d6
| 33821 ||  || — || January 9, 2000 || Socorro || LINEAR || — || align=right | 14 km || 
|-id=822 bgcolor=#C2FFFF
| 33822 ||  || — || January 4, 2000 || Anderson Mesa || LONEOS || L4 || align=right | 23 km || 
|-id=823 bgcolor=#d6d6d6
| 33823 Mariorigutti ||  ||  || February 3, 2000 || San Marcello || M. Tombelli, A. Boattini || KOR || align=right | 3.7 km || 
|-id=824 bgcolor=#fefefe
| 33824 ||  || — || February 29, 2000 || Socorro || LINEAR || NYS || align=right | 3.0 km || 
|-id=825 bgcolor=#fefefe
| 33825 Reganwill ||  ||  || February 28, 2000 || Socorro || LINEAR || FLO || align=right | 2.3 km || 
|-id=826 bgcolor=#fefefe
| 33826 Kevynadams ||  ||  || February 28, 2000 || Socorro || LINEAR || V || align=right | 1.8 km || 
|-id=827 bgcolor=#fefefe
| 33827 || 2000 ED || — || March 1, 2000 || Oizumi || T. Kobayashi || — || align=right | 4.0 km || 
|-id=828 bgcolor=#fefefe
| 33828 ||  || — || March 9, 2000 || Socorro || LINEAR || FLO || align=right | 1.5 km || 
|-id=829 bgcolor=#fefefe
| 33829 Asherson ||  ||  || March 10, 2000 || Socorro || LINEAR || — || align=right | 1.6 km || 
|-id=830 bgcolor=#d6d6d6
| 33830 ||  || — || March 9, 2000 || Socorro || LINEAR || ALA || align=right | 18 km || 
|-id=831 bgcolor=#fefefe
| 33831 ||  || — || March 12, 2000 || Socorro || LINEAR || H || align=right | 1.5 km || 
|-id=832 bgcolor=#fefefe
| 33832 ||  || — || March 11, 2000 || Anderson Mesa || LONEOS || — || align=right | 1.6 km || 
|-id=833 bgcolor=#E9E9E9
| 33833 ||  || — || March 6, 2000 || Haleakala || NEAT || — || align=right | 4.4 km || 
|-id=834 bgcolor=#E9E9E9
| 33834 Hannahkaplan ||  ||  || March 12, 2000 || Anderson Mesa || LONEOS || EUN || align=right | 5.7 km || 
|-id=835 bgcolor=#fefefe
| 33835 ||  || — || March 1, 2000 || Catalina || CSS || FLO || align=right | 1.6 km || 
|-id=836 bgcolor=#FA8072
| 33836 ||  || — || March 29, 2000 || Socorro || LINEAR || — || align=right | 1.9 km || 
|-id=837 bgcolor=#d6d6d6
| 33837 ||  || — || March 29, 2000 || Socorro || LINEAR || PALTj (2.98) || align=right | 7.2 km || 
|-id=838 bgcolor=#d6d6d6
| 33838 Brandabaker ||  ||  || April 5, 2000 || Socorro || LINEAR || THM || align=right | 7.5 km || 
|-id=839 bgcolor=#fefefe
| 33839 ||  || — || April 5, 2000 || Socorro || LINEAR || — || align=right | 2.2 km || 
|-id=840 bgcolor=#fefefe
| 33840 ||  || — || April 5, 2000 || Socorro || LINEAR || NYS || align=right | 2.8 km || 
|-id=841 bgcolor=#E9E9E9
| 33841 ||  || — || April 5, 2000 || Socorro || LINEAR || — || align=right | 7.0 km || 
|-id=842 bgcolor=#E9E9E9
| 33842 ||  || — || April 5, 2000 || Socorro || LINEAR || — || align=right | 2.2 km || 
|-id=843 bgcolor=#fefefe
| 33843 ||  || — || April 11, 2000 || Haleakala || NEAT || H || align=right | 2.1 km || 
|-id=844 bgcolor=#fefefe
| 33844 ||  || — || April 7, 2000 || Socorro || LINEAR || — || align=right | 1.7 km || 
|-id=845 bgcolor=#fefefe
| 33845 ||  || — || April 7, 2000 || Anderson Mesa || LONEOS || FLO || align=right | 1.9 km || 
|-id=846 bgcolor=#E9E9E9
| 33846 ||  || — || April 4, 2000 || Socorro || LINEAR || — || align=right | 2.9 km || 
|-id=847 bgcolor=#fefefe
| 33847 ||  || — || April 3, 2000 || Kitt Peak || Spacewatch || V || align=right | 1.9 km || 
|-id=848 bgcolor=#fefefe
| 33848 ||  || — || April 24, 2000 || Kitt Peak || Spacewatch || — || align=right | 5.4 km || 
|-id=849 bgcolor=#fefefe
| 33849 ||  || — || April 28, 2000 || Socorro || LINEAR || — || align=right | 1.6 km || 
|-id=850 bgcolor=#fefefe
| 33850 ||  || — || April 24, 2000 || Anderson Mesa || LONEOS || — || align=right | 2.4 km || 
|-id=851 bgcolor=#E9E9E9
| 33851 ||  || — || April 29, 2000 || Socorro || LINEAR || — || align=right | 5.7 km || 
|-id=852 bgcolor=#fefefe
| 33852 Baschnagel ||  ||  || April 29, 2000 || Socorro || LINEAR || V || align=right | 1.9 km || 
|-id=853 bgcolor=#fefefe
| 33853 ||  || — || April 29, 2000 || Socorro || LINEAR || FLO || align=right | 1.4 km || 
|-id=854 bgcolor=#d6d6d6
| 33854 ||  || — || April 29, 2000 || Socorro || LINEAR || — || align=right | 5.8 km || 
|-id=855 bgcolor=#E9E9E9
| 33855 ||  || — || April 25, 2000 || Anderson Mesa || LONEOS || — || align=right | 4.3 km || 
|-id=856 bgcolor=#fefefe
| 33856 ||  || — || April 27, 2000 || Anderson Mesa || LONEOS || — || align=right | 4.5 km || 
|-id=857 bgcolor=#fefefe
| 33857 ||  || — || April 27, 2000 || Socorro || LINEAR || — || align=right | 1.7 km || 
|-id=858 bgcolor=#d6d6d6
| 33858 ||  || — || April 28, 2000 || Socorro || LINEAR || URS || align=right | 12 km || 
|-id=859 bgcolor=#fefefe
| 33859 ||  || — || April 29, 2000 || Socorro || LINEAR || — || align=right | 1.5 km || 
|-id=860 bgcolor=#fefefe
| 33860 ||  || — || April 30, 2000 || Kitt Peak || Spacewatch || — || align=right | 2.7 km || 
|-id=861 bgcolor=#E9E9E9
| 33861 Boucvalt ||  ||  || April 29, 2000 || Socorro || LINEAR || — || align=right | 2.2 km || 
|-id=862 bgcolor=#fefefe
| 33862 ||  || — || April 26, 2000 || Anderson Mesa || LONEOS || — || align=right | 3.5 km || 
|-id=863 bgcolor=#fefefe
| 33863 Elfriederwin ||  ||  || May 5, 2000 || Starkenburg Observatory || Starkenburg Obs. || — || align=right | 1.6 km || 
|-id=864 bgcolor=#fefefe
| 33864 ||  || — || May 6, 2000 || Socorro || LINEAR || NYS || align=right | 4.9 km || 
|-id=865 bgcolor=#FA8072
| 33865 ||  || — || May 4, 2000 || Socorro || LINEAR || H || align=right | 2.0 km || 
|-id=866 bgcolor=#d6d6d6
| 33866 ||  || — || May 5, 2000 || Socorro || LINEAR || — || align=right | 7.1 km || 
|-id=867 bgcolor=#fefefe
| 33867 ||  || — || May 3, 2000 || Socorro || LINEAR || — || align=right | 1.3 km || 
|-id=868 bgcolor=#fefefe
| 33868 ||  || — || May 7, 2000 || Socorro || LINEAR || — || align=right | 2.0 km || 
|-id=869 bgcolor=#fefefe
| 33869 Brunnermatt ||  ||  || May 7, 2000 || Socorro || LINEAR || — || align=right | 3.0 km || 
|-id=870 bgcolor=#E9E9E9
| 33870 ||  || — || May 7, 2000 || Socorro || LINEAR || INO || align=right | 3.7 km || 
|-id=871 bgcolor=#fefefe
| 33871 Locastillo ||  ||  || May 7, 2000 || Socorro || LINEAR || — || align=right | 2.0 km || 
|-id=872 bgcolor=#E9E9E9
| 33872 Kristichung ||  ||  || May 7, 2000 || Socorro || LINEAR || — || align=right | 3.5 km || 
|-id=873 bgcolor=#E9E9E9
| 33873 ||  || — || May 9, 2000 || Socorro || LINEAR || — || align=right | 6.7 km || 
|-id=874 bgcolor=#E9E9E9
| 33874 ||  || — || May 9, 2000 || Socorro || LINEAR || EUN || align=right | 5.2 km || 
|-id=875 bgcolor=#fefefe
| 33875 Laurencooney ||  ||  || May 6, 2000 || Socorro || LINEAR || V || align=right | 1.7 km || 
|-id=876 bgcolor=#d6d6d6
| 33876 ||  || — || May 6, 2000 || Socorro || LINEAR || — || align=right | 6.4 km || 
|-id=877 bgcolor=#fefefe
| 33877 ||  || — || May 6, 2000 || Socorro || LINEAR || — || align=right | 2.4 km || 
|-id=878 bgcolor=#fefefe
| 33878 ||  || — || May 7, 2000 || Socorro || LINEAR || — || align=right | 1.8 km || 
|-id=879 bgcolor=#fefefe
| 33879 Kierstendeen ||  ||  || May 7, 2000 || Socorro || LINEAR || — || align=right | 2.3 km || 
|-id=880 bgcolor=#fefefe
| 33880 ||  || — || May 5, 2000 || Socorro || LINEAR || — || align=right | 2.8 km || 
|-id=881 bgcolor=#FA8072
| 33881 ||  || — || May 6, 2000 || Socorro || LINEAR || — || align=right | 4.0 km || 
|-id=882 bgcolor=#fefefe
| 33882 ||  || — || May 4, 2000 || Anderson Mesa || LONEOS || V || align=right | 1.6 km || 
|-id=883 bgcolor=#fefefe
| 33883 ||  || — || May 27, 2000 || Reedy Creek || J. Broughton || NYS || align=right | 5.1 km || 
|-id=884 bgcolor=#fefefe
| 33884 ||  || — || May 28, 2000 || Socorro || LINEAR || EUT || align=right | 1.2 km || 
|-id=885 bgcolor=#fefefe
| 33885 ||  || — || May 28, 2000 || Socorro || LINEAR || — || align=right | 2.1 km || 
|-id=886 bgcolor=#E9E9E9
| 33886 Lilydeveau ||  ||  || May 28, 2000 || Socorro || LINEAR || — || align=right | 3.6 km || 
|-id=887 bgcolor=#fefefe
| 33887 ||  || — || May 28, 2000 || Socorro || LINEAR || — || align=right | 2.3 km || 
|-id=888 bgcolor=#fefefe
| 33888 ||  || — || May 29, 2000 || Anderson Mesa || LONEOS || H || align=right | 1.8 km || 
|-id=889 bgcolor=#fefefe
| 33889 Jengebo ||  ||  || May 28, 2000 || Socorro || LINEAR || FLO || align=right | 1.9 km || 
|-id=890 bgcolor=#fefefe
| 33890 ||  || — || May 28, 2000 || Socorro || LINEAR || NYS || align=right | 1.4 km || 
|-id=891 bgcolor=#fefefe
| 33891 ||  || — || May 28, 2000 || Socorro || LINEAR || NYS || align=right | 1.8 km || 
|-id=892 bgcolor=#E9E9E9
| 33892 Meligingrich ||  ||  || May 28, 2000 || Socorro || LINEAR || — || align=right | 2.8 km || 
|-id=893 bgcolor=#E9E9E9
| 33893 ||  || — || May 28, 2000 || Socorro || LINEAR || ADE || align=right | 6.5 km || 
|-id=894 bgcolor=#d6d6d6
| 33894 ||  || — || May 28, 2000 || Socorro || LINEAR || — || align=right | 13 km || 
|-id=895 bgcolor=#fefefe
| 33895 ||  || — || May 28, 2000 || Socorro || LINEAR || — || align=right | 2.6 km || 
|-id=896 bgcolor=#fefefe
| 33896 Hickson ||  ||  || May 30, 2000 || Anderson Mesa || LONEOS || H || align=right | 2.6 km || 
|-id=897 bgcolor=#fefefe
| 33897 Erikagreen ||  ||  || May 27, 2000 || Socorro || LINEAR || V || align=right | 1.6 km || 
|-id=898 bgcolor=#E9E9E9
| 33898 Kendra ||  ||  || May 29, 2000 || Socorro || LINEAR || — || align=right | 3.7 km || 
|-id=899 bgcolor=#E9E9E9
| 33899 ||  || — || May 27, 2000 || Socorro || LINEAR || — || align=right | 4.3 km || 
|-id=900 bgcolor=#fefefe
| 33900 ||  || — || May 27, 2000 || Socorro || LINEAR || NYS || align=right | 1.9 km || 
|}

33901–34000 

|-bgcolor=#fefefe
| 33901 ||  || — || May 27, 2000 || Socorro || LINEAR || — || align=right | 4.7 km || 
|-id=902 bgcolor=#fefefe
| 33902 Ingoldsby ||  ||  || May 27, 2000 || Socorro || LINEAR || — || align=right | 2.4 km || 
|-id=903 bgcolor=#E9E9E9
| 33903 ||  || — || May 30, 2000 || Anderson Mesa || LONEOS || — || align=right | 18 km || 
|-id=904 bgcolor=#E9E9E9
| 33904 Janardhanan ||  ||  || May 27, 2000 || Socorro || LINEAR || — || align=right | 3.0 km || 
|-id=905 bgcolor=#fefefe
| 33905 Leyajoykutty ||  ||  || May 27, 2000 || Socorro || LINEAR || V || align=right | 2.0 km || 
|-id=906 bgcolor=#fefefe
| 33906 ||  || — || May 26, 2000 || Kitt Peak || Spacewatch || — || align=right | 2.6 km || 
|-id=907 bgcolor=#fefefe
| 33907 Christykrenek ||  ||  || June 5, 2000 || Socorro || LINEAR || FLO || align=right | 1.8 km || 
|-id=908 bgcolor=#fefefe
| 33908 ||  || — || June 5, 2000 || Socorro || LINEAR || H || align=right | 1.4 km || 
|-id=909 bgcolor=#E9E9E9
| 33909 ||  || — || June 5, 2000 || Socorro || LINEAR || — || align=right | 9.9 km || 
|-id=910 bgcolor=#fefefe
| 33910 Lestarge ||  ||  || June 5, 2000 || Socorro || LINEAR || FLO || align=right | 2.0 km || 
|-id=911 bgcolor=#E9E9E9
| 33911 ||  || — || June 4, 2000 || Socorro || LINEAR || — || align=right | 4.9 km || 
|-id=912 bgcolor=#fefefe
| 33912 Melissanoland ||  ||  || June 6, 2000 || Socorro || LINEAR || FLO || align=right | 2.9 km || 
|-id=913 bgcolor=#fefefe
| 33913 ||  || — || June 7, 2000 || Socorro || LINEAR || CHL || align=right | 7.8 km || 
|-id=914 bgcolor=#d6d6d6
| 33914 ||  || — || June 7, 2000 || Socorro || LINEAR || — || align=right | 5.5 km || 
|-id=915 bgcolor=#fefefe
| 33915 ||  || — || June 5, 2000 || Črni Vrh || Črni Vrh || FLO || align=right | 3.6 km || 
|-id=916 bgcolor=#fefefe
| 33916 ||  || — || June 8, 2000 || Socorro || LINEAR || — || align=right | 4.1 km || 
|-id=917 bgcolor=#fefefe
| 33917 Kellyoconnor ||  ||  || June 8, 2000 || Socorro || LINEAR || — || align=right | 3.7 km || 
|-id=918 bgcolor=#fefefe
| 33918 Janiscoville ||  ||  || June 8, 2000 || Socorro || LINEAR || — || align=right | 3.3 km || 
|-id=919 bgcolor=#E9E9E9
| 33919 ||  || — || June 8, 2000 || Socorro || LINEAR || ADE || align=right | 6.8 km || 
|-id=920 bgcolor=#fefefe
| 33920 Trivisonno ||  ||  || June 8, 2000 || Socorro || LINEAR || FLO || align=right | 2.9 km || 
|-id=921 bgcolor=#d6d6d6
| 33921 ||  || — || June 8, 2000 || Socorro || LINEAR || ALA || align=right | 13 km || 
|-id=922 bgcolor=#d6d6d6
| 33922 ||  || — || June 6, 2000 || Kitt Peak || Spacewatch || — || align=right | 7.5 km || 
|-id=923 bgcolor=#E9E9E9
| 33923 Juliewarren ||  ||  || June 7, 2000 || Socorro || LINEAR || — || align=right | 2.2 km || 
|-id=924 bgcolor=#E9E9E9
| 33924 ||  || — || June 1, 2000 || Anderson Mesa || LONEOS || — || align=right | 3.7 km || 
|-id=925 bgcolor=#fefefe
| 33925 ||  || — || June 11, 2000 || Valinhos || P. R. Holvorcem || — || align=right | 2.7 km || 
|-id=926 bgcolor=#E9E9E9
| 33926 ||  || — || June 6, 2000 || Anderson Mesa || LONEOS || — || align=right | 4.9 km || 
|-id=927 bgcolor=#fefefe
| 33927 ||  || — || June 6, 2000 || Anderson Mesa || LONEOS || — || align=right | 1.9 km || 
|-id=928 bgcolor=#E9E9E9
| 33928 ||  || — || June 6, 2000 || Anderson Mesa || LONEOS || — || align=right | 4.5 km || 
|-id=929 bgcolor=#fefefe
| 33929 Lisaprato ||  ||  || June 6, 2000 || Anderson Mesa || LONEOS || NYS || align=right | 2.8 km || 
|-id=930 bgcolor=#fefefe
| 33930 ||  || — || June 6, 2000 || Anderson Mesa || LONEOS || — || align=right | 2.8 km || 
|-id=931 bgcolor=#fefefe
| 33931 ||  || — || June 6, 2000 || Anderson Mesa || LONEOS || FLO || align=right | 2.3 km || 
|-id=932 bgcolor=#d6d6d6
| 33932 Keane ||  ||  || June 6, 2000 || Anderson Mesa || LONEOS || HYG || align=right | 9.6 km || 
|-id=933 bgcolor=#fefefe
| 33933 ||  || — || June 9, 2000 || Anderson Mesa || LONEOS || — || align=right | 3.2 km || 
|-id=934 bgcolor=#fefefe
| 33934 ||  || — || June 7, 2000 || Socorro || LINEAR || NYS || align=right | 1.8 km || 
|-id=935 bgcolor=#d6d6d6
| 33935 ||  || — || June 7, 2000 || Socorro || LINEAR || 7:4 || align=right | 10 km || 
|-id=936 bgcolor=#E9E9E9
| 33936 Johnwells ||  ||  || June 7, 2000 || Socorro || LINEAR || — || align=right | 3.5 km || 
|-id=937 bgcolor=#E9E9E9
| 33937 Raphaelmarschall ||  ||  || June 5, 2000 || Anderson Mesa || LONEOS || ADE || align=right | 9.7 km || 
|-id=938 bgcolor=#fefefe
| 33938 ||  || — || June 4, 2000 || Haleakala || NEAT || — || align=right | 3.1 km || 
|-id=939 bgcolor=#d6d6d6
| 33939 ||  || — || June 1, 2000 || Anderson Mesa || LONEOS || — || align=right | 4.8 km || 
|-id=940 bgcolor=#fefefe
| 33940 ||  || — || June 1, 2000 || Anderson Mesa || LONEOS || — || align=right | 6.6 km || 
|-id=941 bgcolor=#fefefe
| 33941 ||  || — || June 1, 2000 || Anderson Mesa || LONEOS || — || align=right | 2.5 km || 
|-id=942 bgcolor=#fefefe
| 33942 ||  || — || June 1, 2000 || Anderson Mesa || LONEOS || NYS || align=right | 2.1 km || 
|-id=943 bgcolor=#fefefe
| 33943 ||  || — || June 1, 2000 || Haleakala || NEAT || SUL || align=right | 7.5 km || 
|-id=944 bgcolor=#fefefe
| 33944 || 2000 MA || — || June 16, 2000 || Valinhos || P. R. Holvorcem || — || align=right | 2.5 km || 
|-id=945 bgcolor=#fefefe
| 33945 || 2000 MR || — || June 24, 2000 || Haleakala || NEAT || — || align=right | 2.9 km || 
|-id=946 bgcolor=#fefefe
| 33946 || 2000 MV || — || June 24, 2000 || Reedy Creek || J. Broughton || — || align=right | 1.7 km || 
|-id=947 bgcolor=#E9E9E9
| 33947 ||  || — || June 25, 2000 || Socorro || LINEAR || — || align=right | 8.9 km || 
|-id=948 bgcolor=#fefefe
| 33948 ||  || — || June 25, 2000 || Farpoint || Farpoint Obs. || FLO || align=right | 2.0 km || 
|-id=949 bgcolor=#fefefe
| 33949 ||  || — || June 25, 2000 || Socorro || LINEAR || — || align=right | 3.2 km || 
|-id=950 bgcolor=#fefefe
| 33950 ||  || — || June 25, 2000 || Socorro || LINEAR || — || align=right | 2.5 km || 
|-id=951 bgcolor=#E9E9E9
| 33951 ||  || — || June 26, 2000 || Socorro || LINEAR || — || align=right | 5.5 km || 
|-id=952 bgcolor=#fefefe
| 33952 ||  || — || June 26, 2000 || Socorro || LINEAR || — || align=right | 5.2 km || 
|-id=953 bgcolor=#fefefe
| 33953 ||  || — || June 30, 2000 || Haleakala || NEAT || FLO || align=right | 2.0 km || 
|-id=954 bgcolor=#fefefe
| 33954 || 2000 ND || — || July 1, 2000 || Prescott || P. G. Comba || — || align=right | 2.2 km || 
|-id=955 bgcolor=#E9E9E9
| 33955 ||  || — || July 6, 2000 || Prescott || P. G. Comba || — || align=right | 2.3 km || 
|-id=956 bgcolor=#E9E9E9
| 33956 ||  || — || July 3, 2000 || Socorro || LINEAR || EUN || align=right | 6.8 km || 
|-id=957 bgcolor=#E9E9E9
| 33957 ||  || — || July 7, 2000 || Socorro || LINEAR || — || align=right | 3.1 km || 
|-id=958 bgcolor=#fefefe
| 33958 Zaferiou ||  ||  || July 7, 2000 || Socorro || LINEAR || FLO || align=right | 3.7 km || 
|-id=959 bgcolor=#fefefe
| 33959 ||  || — || July 3, 2000 || Kitt Peak || Spacewatch || FLO || align=right | 1.8 km || 
|-id=960 bgcolor=#d6d6d6
| 33960 ||  || — || July 7, 2000 || Socorro || LINEAR || — || align=right | 7.3 km || 
|-id=961 bgcolor=#fefefe
| 33961 Macinleyneve ||  ||  || July 7, 2000 || Socorro || LINEAR || NYS || align=right | 2.5 km || 
|-id=962 bgcolor=#E9E9E9
| 33962 ||  || — || July 6, 2000 || Socorro || LINEAR || — || align=right | 9.7 km || 
|-id=963 bgcolor=#fefefe
| 33963 Moranhidalgo ||  ||  || July 7, 2000 || Socorro || LINEAR || V || align=right | 2.0 km || 
|-id=964 bgcolor=#fefefe
| 33964 ||  || — || July 6, 2000 || Anderson Mesa || LONEOS || V || align=right | 2.4 km || 
|-id=965 bgcolor=#E9E9E9
| 33965 ||  || — || July 10, 2000 || Valinhos || P. R. Holvorcem || — || align=right | 3.6 km || 
|-id=966 bgcolor=#fefefe
| 33966 ||  || — || July 10, 2000 || Valinhos || P. R. Holvorcem || FLO || align=right | 2.7 km || 
|-id=967 bgcolor=#d6d6d6
| 33967 ||  || — || July 5, 2000 || Anderson Mesa || LONEOS || — || align=right | 4.4 km || 
|-id=968 bgcolor=#fefefe
| 33968 ||  || — || July 5, 2000 || Anderson Mesa || LONEOS || — || align=right | 2.5 km || 
|-id=969 bgcolor=#E9E9E9
| 33969 ||  || — || July 5, 2000 || Anderson Mesa || LONEOS || HNS || align=right | 3.7 km || 
|-id=970 bgcolor=#d6d6d6
| 33970 ||  || — || July 5, 2000 || Anderson Mesa || LONEOS || TEL || align=right | 3.9 km || 
|-id=971 bgcolor=#fefefe
| 33971 ||  || — || July 5, 2000 || Anderson Mesa || LONEOS || V || align=right | 3.3 km || 
|-id=972 bgcolor=#fefefe
| 33972 ||  || — || July 5, 2000 || Anderson Mesa || LONEOS || FLO || align=right | 2.2 km || 
|-id=973 bgcolor=#E9E9E9
| 33973 ||  || — || July 5, 2000 || Anderson Mesa || LONEOS || GEF || align=right | 4.4 km || 
|-id=974 bgcolor=#fefefe
| 33974 ||  || — || July 5, 2000 || Anderson Mesa || LONEOS || SUL || align=right | 7.1 km || 
|-id=975 bgcolor=#E9E9E9
| 33975 ||  || — || July 5, 2000 || Anderson Mesa || LONEOS || — || align=right | 5.9 km || 
|-id=976 bgcolor=#fefefe
| 33976 ||  || — || July 5, 2000 || Anderson Mesa || LONEOS || — || align=right | 2.1 km || 
|-id=977 bgcolor=#E9E9E9
| 33977 ||  || — || July 5, 2000 || Anderson Mesa || LONEOS || — || align=right | 3.2 km || 
|-id=978 bgcolor=#fefefe
| 33978 ||  || — || July 6, 2000 || Anderson Mesa || LONEOS || — || align=right | 2.1 km || 
|-id=979 bgcolor=#fefefe
| 33979 Sunhaochun ||  ||  || July 7, 2000 || Socorro || LINEAR || FLO || align=right | 3.3 km || 
|-id=980 bgcolor=#E9E9E9
| 33980 ||  || — || July 7, 2000 || Socorro || LINEAR || — || align=right | 4.8 km || 
|-id=981 bgcolor=#E9E9E9
| 33981 ||  || — || July 7, 2000 || Anderson Mesa || LONEOS || — || align=right | 7.5 km || 
|-id=982 bgcolor=#E9E9E9
| 33982 ||  || — || July 5, 2000 || Anderson Mesa || LONEOS || — || align=right | 5.0 km || 
|-id=983 bgcolor=#fefefe
| 33983 ||  || — || July 5, 2000 || Anderson Mesa || LONEOS || — || align=right | 3.3 km || 
|-id=984 bgcolor=#E9E9E9
| 33984 ||  || — || July 4, 2000 || Anderson Mesa || LONEOS || — || align=right | 4.1 km || 
|-id=985 bgcolor=#fefefe
| 33985 ||  || — || July 4, 2000 || Anderson Mesa || LONEOS || — || align=right | 4.6 km || 
|-id=986 bgcolor=#fefefe
| 33986 ||  || — || July 4, 2000 || Anderson Mesa || LONEOS || ERI || align=right | 4.5 km || 
|-id=987 bgcolor=#fefefe
| 33987 ||  || — || July 4, 2000 || Anderson Mesa || LONEOS || — || align=right | 2.6 km || 
|-id=988 bgcolor=#fefefe
| 33988 ||  || — || July 4, 2000 || Anderson Mesa || LONEOS || NYS || align=right | 2.0 km || 
|-id=989 bgcolor=#fefefe
| 33989 ||  || — || July 4, 2000 || Anderson Mesa || LONEOS || — || align=right | 2.2 km || 
|-id=990 bgcolor=#fefefe
| 33990 ||  || — || July 4, 2000 || Anderson Mesa || LONEOS || NYS || align=right | 2.3 km || 
|-id=991 bgcolor=#fefefe
| 33991 Weixunjing ||  ||  || July 3, 2000 || Socorro || LINEAR || V || align=right | 1.8 km || 
|-id=992 bgcolor=#E9E9E9
| 33992 || 2000 OQ || — || July 23, 2000 || Reedy Creek || J. Broughton || — || align=right | 3.3 km || 
|-id=993 bgcolor=#E9E9E9
| 33993 || 2000 OS || — || July 23, 2000 || Reedy Creek || J. Broughton || — || align=right | 3.8 km || 
|-id=994 bgcolor=#fefefe
| 33994 Regidufour ||  ||  || July 26, 2000 || Needville || Needville Obs. || — || align=right | 2.3 km || 
|-id=995 bgcolor=#fefefe
| 33995 ||  || — || July 26, 2000 || Farpoint || Farpoint Obs. || — || align=right | 1.5 km || 
|-id=996 bgcolor=#d6d6d6
| 33996 ||  || — || July 28, 2000 || Prescott || P. G. Comba || — || align=right | 2.6 km || 
|-id=997 bgcolor=#d6d6d6
| 33997 ||  || — || July 24, 2000 || Socorro || LINEAR || — || align=right | 20 km || 
|-id=998 bgcolor=#fefefe
| 33998 ||  || — || July 24, 2000 || Socorro || LINEAR || — || align=right | 2.4 km || 
|-id=999 bgcolor=#d6d6d6
| 33999 ||  || — || July 24, 2000 || Socorro || LINEAR || EOS || align=right | 5.6 km || 
|-id=000 bgcolor=#E9E9E9
| 34000 Martinmatl ||  ||  || July 24, 2000 || Socorro || LINEAR || — || align=right | 4.5 km || 
|}

References

External links 
 Discovery Circumstances: Numbered Minor Planets (30001)–(35000) (IAU Minor Planet Center)

0033